= Gigantic (magazine) =

American literary magazine

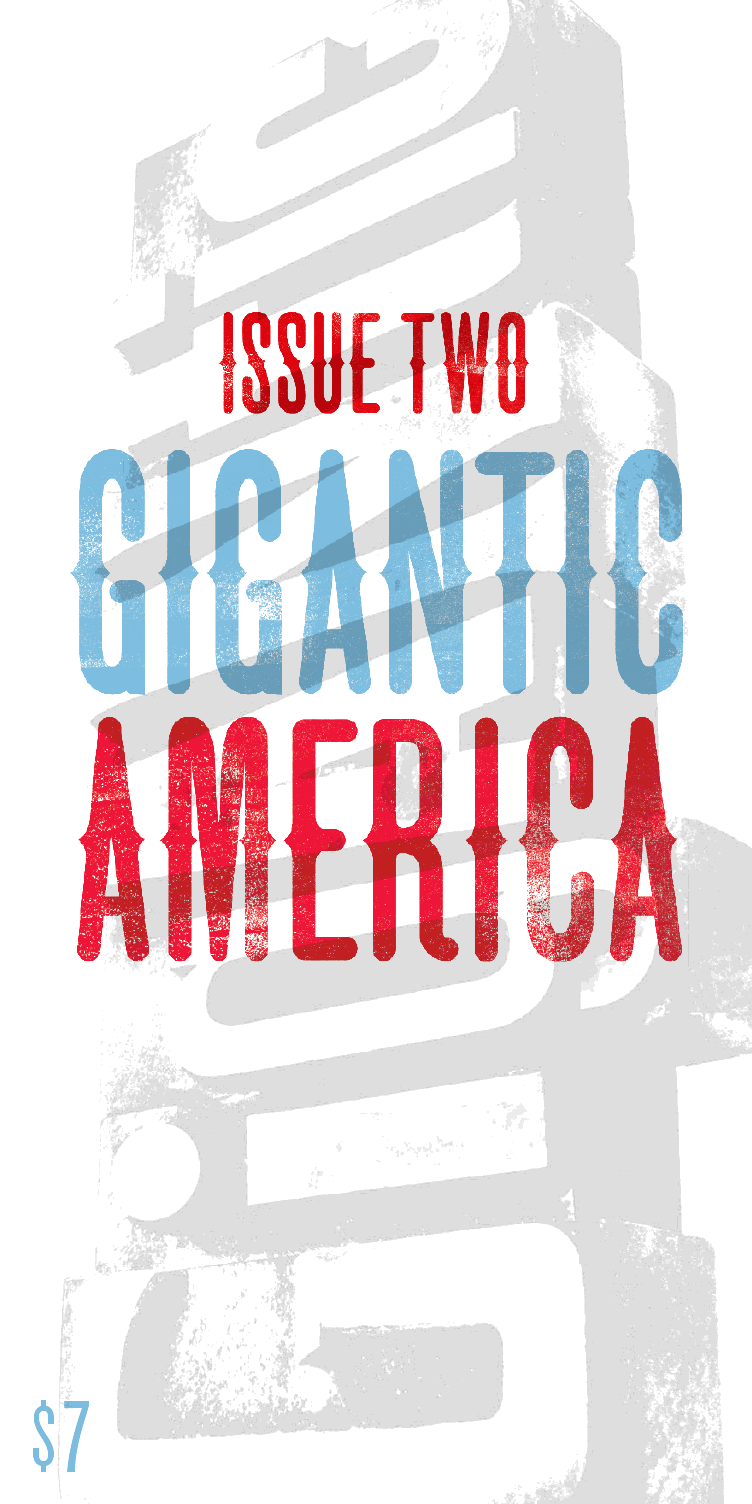
- Cover of issue #2
- The Editors: Lincoln Michel and James Yeh
- Categories: literature, culture, arts
- Frequency: Annual
- Founded: 2008
- First issue: April 2009
- Country: United States
- Based in: New York City
- Language: English
- Website: www.thegiganticmag.com/

Gigantic is an American literary journal that publishes fiction, art and interviews. In particular, it focuses on short prose or flash fiction. Print issues also have included a special poetry section entitled "The Seizure State," curated by celebrated American poet Joe Wenderoth. It publishes original work online at its website and once a year in a print format. Gigantic was founded in 2008 by four writers living in New York City.

== Format ==
Gigantic is known for changing its layout and design significantly with each issue, as well as a focus on affordable pricing. Issues have ranged in price from 3 to 10 dollars. The layout is designed by Erin Grey West.

=== Issue 1 ===
The first issue was printed on newsprint in a large fold-out format. It included a centerfold painting by Nathaniel Russell as well as work and dialogues with Malcolm Gladwell, Shane Jones, Ed Park, Tao Lin, Deb Olin Unferth, Gary Shteyngart and others.

=== Issue 2 ===
Issue 2 was titled "Gigantic America" and focused on themes of Americana. The magazine was printed in a bound elongated format and included a series of limited edition trading cards designed by Andre Da Loba backed with writing by Deb Olin Unferth, Joe Wenderoth, Clancy Martin, Margo Jefferson, and others. Other writers in the issue included Blake Butler, Robert Coover, Luca Dipierro, Lydia Millet, Sam Lipsyte, Leni Zumas, and comic artist Adrian Tomine.

=== Issue 3 ===
Issue 3 was titled "Gigantic Indoors." The magazine was printed in the magazine's largest format yet and featured work from David Berman, Diane Williams, Joshua Cohen, and many others. Also included are dialogues with Gordon Lish and Lynne Tillman.

=== Issue 4 ===
Issue 4 was titled "Gigantic Everything." The magazine was printed in a hand-constructed, accordion-fold format and included fiction from Robert Walser, Etgar Keret, and Tony Duvert, as well as dialogues with Lydia Davis, Julie Hecht, and Tao Lin, among others.

=== Issue 5 ===
Issue 5 was titled "Gigantic Talk." The magazine featured a special call-in phone element and included work from Lydia Davis, Gary Indiana, David Ohle, and Sparrow. Also included are dialogues with Brian Christian and Travis Millard and Mel Kadel.

=== Issue 6 ===
Issue 6 was titled "Gigantic Ha-Ha." The magazine featured new and newly translated work by Franz Kafka, Roz Chast, Jincy Willett, Amelia Gray, James Hannaham, and Osama Alomar, along with dialogues with Gabrielle Bell and J. Robert Lennon.

== Gigantic Books ==
In 2015, Gigantic published its first book, Gigantic Worlds. The book is an anthology of science flash fiction stories with work from Charles Yu, Catherine Lacey, Ted Chiang, and Lynne Tillman.

== Website ==
The website is updated most months with new content. One notable series has been the serialization of a picture-novel by Leni Zumas and Luca Dipierro entitled "Until I Find It."

== Notable contributors ==
Gigantic has featured many notable writers and artists, including:

- Robert Walser
- Lydia Davis
- Franz Kafka
- Etgar Keret
- David Berman
- Robert Coover
- Tao Lin
- Julie Hecht
- Jincy Willett
- Joe Wenderoth
- Lynne Tillman
- Sparrow
- Deb Olin Unferth
- Leni Zumas
- Ed Park
- Thomas Doyle
- Diane Williams
- Gordon Lish
- Joshua Cohen
- Todd Zuniga
- Clancy Martin
- Shane Jones
- Michael Kimball

== See also ==
- List of literary magazines
