= List of experimental women writers =

This is a partial list of women who write experimental literature.

== A ==
- Kathy Acker
- Renata Adler
- Anna Akhmatova
- Roberta Allen
- Hannah Arendt
- Rae Armantrout

== B ==
- Ingeborg Bachmann
- Djuna Barnes
- Dodie Bellamy
- Aase Berg
- Kate Bernheimer
- Mei-mei Berssenbrugge
- Elizabeth Bishop
- Jenny Boully
- Jane Bowles
- Giannina Braschi
- Lucie Brock-Broido
- Christine Brooke-Rose
- Anna Burns
- Octavia Butler

== C ==
- Can Xue
- Mary Caponegro
- Leonora Carrington
- Anne Carson
- Angela Carter
- Suzanne Césaire
- Theresa Hak Kyung Cha
- Alexandra Chasin
- Maxine Chernoff
- Hélène Cixous
- Colette
- Wanda Coleman
- Lucy Corin
- Jayne Cortez
- Lynn Crawford

== D ==
- Susan Daitch
- Lydia Davis
- Debra Di Blasi
- Emily Dickinson
- Joan Didion
- H. D.
- Rikki Ducornet
- Rachel Blau DuPlessis
- Marguerite Duras
- Danielle Dutton

== E ==
- Deborah Eisenberg
- Carol Emshwiller
- Bernardine Evaristo

== F ==
- Thalia Field
- Eva Figes
- Kass Fleisher
- Janet Frame

== G ==
- Janice Galloway
- Anne F. Garréta
- Nikki Giovanni
- Louise Glück
- Jaimy Gordon
- Susan Griffin
- Barbara Guest

== H ==
- Jessica Hagedorn
- Han Kang
- Donna Haraway
- Lyn Hejinian
- Noy Holland
- Jenny Holzer
- Fanny Howe
- Susan Howe
- Erica Hunt
- Zora Neale Hurston
- Kim Hyesoon

== I-J ==
- Shelley Jackson
- Elfriede Jelinek

== K ==
- Bhanu Kapil
- Anna Kavan
- Yayoi Kusama

== L ==
- Ann Lauterbach
- Violette Leduc
- Janice Lee
- Ursula K. Le Guin
- Louise Wareham Leonard
- Stacey Levine
- Robin Coste Lewis
- Clarice Lispector
- Layli Long Soldier
- Audre Lorde
- Mina Loy
- Valeria Luiselli

== M ==
- Eimear McBride
- Joyelle McSweeney
- Joyce Mansour
- Katherine Mansfield
- Micheline Aharonian Marcom
- Carole Maso
- Bernadette Mayer
- Cris Mazza
- Ursule Molinaro
- Marianne Moore
- Tracie Morris
- Toni Morrison
- Thylias Moss
- Granaz Moussavi
- Harryette Mullen
- Laura Mullen
- Herta Müller

== N-O ==
- Suniti Namjoshi
- Marie NDiaye
- Maggie Nelson
- Lorine Niedecker
- Anaïs Nin
- Dorthe Nors
- Alice Notley
- Alissa Nutting
- Silvina Ocampo

== P-Q ==
- Aimee Parkison
- M. NourbeSe Philip
- Alejandra Pizarnik
- Sylvia Plath
- Vanessa Place
- Gisele Prassinos
- Lia Purpura
- Ann Quin

== R ==
- Dawn Raffel
- Claudia Rankine
- Ariana Reines
- Adrienne Rich
- Dorothy Richardson
- Laura Riding
- Michèle Roberts
- Mercè Rodoreda
- Avital Ronell
- Fran Ross
- Joanna Russ
- Pamela Ryder

== S ==
- Sonia Sanchez
- Sappho
- Nathalie Sarraute
- Leslie Scalapino
- Lynda Schor
- Christine Schutt
- Ntozake Shange
- Laurie Sheck
- Mary Shelley
- Sei Shōnagon
- Leslie Marmon Silko
- Ali Smith
- Patricia Smith (poet)
- Tracy K. Smith
- Anna Joy Springer
- Gertrude Stein
- Susan Steinberg (author)
- Laurie Stone
- Marlene Streeruwitz
- Terese Svoboda
- Cole Swensen

== T ==
- Melanie Rae Thon
- Marina Tsvetaeva

== U-W ==
- Dubravka Ugrešić
- Luisa Valenzuela
- Rosmarie Waldrop
- Anne Waldman
- Helen Weinzweig
- Marjorie Welish
- Diane Williams (author)
- Christa Wolf
- Uljana Wolf
- Virginia Woolf
- Carolyn D. Wright

== X-Z ==
- Monica Youn
- Marguerite Young
- Lidia Yuknavitch
- Zitkala-Sa
- Unica Zürn

== See also ==
- Lists of writers
- 20th century in literature
- 20th century in poetry
- 21st century in literature
- List of years in literature
- List of avant-garde artists
- Non-fiction
- Fiction
