= Guernica (magazine) =

Online magazine of arts and culture

Guernica / A Magazine of Art and Politics
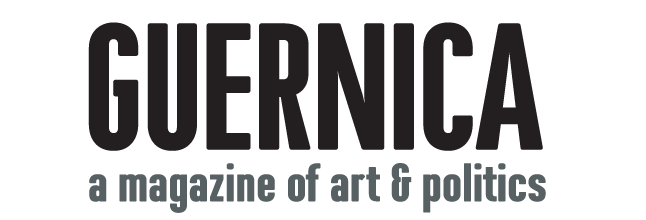
- Editors at Large: Michael Archer, Salar Abdoh
- Categories: Literary, art and political
- Frequency: Daily
- Founded: 2004; 22 years ago
- Company: Guernica Inc.
- Country: United States
- Based in: New York City
- Language: English
- Website: www.guernicamag.com

Guernica / A Magazine of Art and Politics is an American digital magazine known for publishing fiction, poetry, essays, reportage, art, and interviews that focus primarily on global perspectives and the intersection between art and politics. The magazine is particularly committed to world literature, platforming marginalized voices and translating work from all continents into English, and it has been a place of first publication for many notable writers.

== History ==
Guernica was founded in 2004 by Joel Whitney, Michael Archer, Josh Jones, and Elizabeth Onusko. Guernica Inc. has been a not-for-profit corporation since 2009. National Book Foundation Director Lisa Lucas was the publisher of Guernica from 2014 until 2016. Madhuri Sastry and Jina Moore were co-publishers from 2021 until 2024.

== Awards and events ==
In 2008, Okey Ndibe's "My Biafran Eyes" won a Best of the Web prize from Dzanc Books. In 2008, Rebecca Morgan Frank's "Rescue" was chosen for the Best New Poets award.

In 2009, Matthew Derby's short story for Guernica, "January in December", won a Best of the Web prize from Dzanc Books.

In 2009, E. C. Osondu was awarded the Caine Prize for African Writing for his Guernica short story, "Waiting".

In 2010, Mark Dowie's "Food Among the Ruins" was chosen for the Best of the Net anthology. In 2010, Oliver de la Paz's poem "Requiem for the Orchard", F. Daniel Rzicnek's poem "Geomancy" and Elizabeth Crane's short story "The Genius Meetings" won Best of the Web prizes from Dzanc Books.

In 2011, Bridget Potter's essay "Lucky Girl" was chosen for The Best American Essays, 2011, guest-edited by Edwidge Danticat. In 2011, Jack Shenker's "Dam Dilemma" was part of a portfolio of his work longlisted for the Orwell Prize for Political Writing in the UK.

In 2013, Guernica won Utne magazine's Media Award for Best Social/Cultural Coverage.

In 2016, Alexander Chee's essay "Girl" was chosen for The Best American Essays, 2016, edited by Jonathan Franzen.

Guernica won the 2016 AWP Small Press Publisher Award given by the Association of Writers & Writing Programs that "acknowledges the hard work, creativity, and innovation" of small presses and "their contributions to the literary landscape" of the US.

In 2017, Guernica won the PEN American Center Nora Magid Award for Editing.

In 2019, Nana Kwame Adjei-Brenyah's short story "The Era" was chosen for The Best American Short Stories 2019, edited by Anthony Doerr.

In 2023, Guernica won a Whiting Award. In their citation, the judges noted: "Perennially curious, eager to reckon with the world head-on, Guernica draws readers into uncharted conversations and traces the complex ligaments connecting culture, politics, art, and ecology. Over twenty years, Guernica has built an impressive record as a place of first publication for important writers and thinkers."

== Contributors and editors ==
Contributors include Lorraine Adams, Chimamanda Ngozi Adichie, Jesse Ball, A. Igoni Barrett, Jamel Brinkley, Amit Chaudhuri, Susan Choi, Noam Chomsky, Billy Collins, Susan Daitch, Marguerite Duras, Stephen Elliott, Rivka Galchen, James Galvin, Amitav Ghosh, Mahvish Khan, Alexandra Kleeman, Eric Kraft, Kiese Laymon, Douglas Light, Sarah Lindsay, Dorthe Nors, Okey Ndibe, Meghan O'Rourke, Zachary Mason, Tracy O'Neill, Daniele Pantano, Matthew Rohrer, Deb Olin Unferth, Sergio Ramírez, Amartya Sen, Aurelie Sheehan, Jonathan Steele, Laren Stover, Terese Svoboda, Mitch Swenson, Olufemi Terry, Anthony Tognazzini, Frederic Tuten, Joe Wenderoth Patrick White, and Yaa Gyasi.

Guest fiction and poetry editors have included Alexander Chee, Roxane Gay, Francisco Goldman, Randa Jarrar, Sam Lipsyte, Ben Marcus, Claire Messud, George Saunders, Tracy K. Smith, and Frederic Tuten.

Interview subjects have included filmmaker John Waters, Nobel laureate László Krasznahorkai, Congressman John Conyers, Congresswomen Marcy Kaptur and Carolyn B. Maloney, Costa Rican President Óscar Arias, Justice Department legal counsel John Yoo, former member of Dutch Parliament Ayaan Hirsi Ali, former Iraqi cabinet member Ali Allawi, artist Chuck Close, singers Lila Downs and David Byrne, and authors Etgar Keret, Andrew Bacevich, Don DeLillo, Howard Zinn, Samantha Power, Bernard-Henri Lévy, Nicholas D. Kristof, Joan Didion, playwright Tony Kushner, and actor Mia Farrow.

Previous longtime senior editors include Rachel Riederer (editor-in-chief, 2017-2019), Ed Winstead (editor-in-chief, 2019-2021), Meakin Armstrong (senior editor, fiction 2006-2022) and Erica Wright (senior editor, poetry 2007-2022). The current masthead is composed of nonfiction editor Shze-Hui Tjoa, fiction editor William Pei Shih, poetry editor Nathalie Handal, managing editor Andra Otilia Nicolescu, and editor-in-chief Raaza Jamshed.

In March of 2024, a disagreement over the publication of Israeli writer and translator Joanna Chen’s essay “From the Edges of a Broken World” led to the resignation of some Guernica editors, as well as of co-publishers Madhuri Sastry and Jina Moore. At the author’s invitation, the magazine retracted the piece, with co-founder Michael Archer writing: “the essay was ultimately removed from Guernica's pages for the same reason I assumed the author invited its retraction—it was further wounding a historically silenced community already under siege.” Chen’s essay was re-published in the Washington Monthly on March 18th.

In 2025, Guernica relaunched with two winter issues guest-edited by Valeria Luiselli, Heather Cleary, Kamila Shamsie, Nimmi Gowrinathan, Maaza Mengiste, Mirza Waheed, Jacqueline Woodson, Jamal Mahjoub, Salar Abdoh, and Nathalie Handal.

== See also ==
- List of literary magazines
