= Evan Lavender-Smith =

American writer, editor, and professor

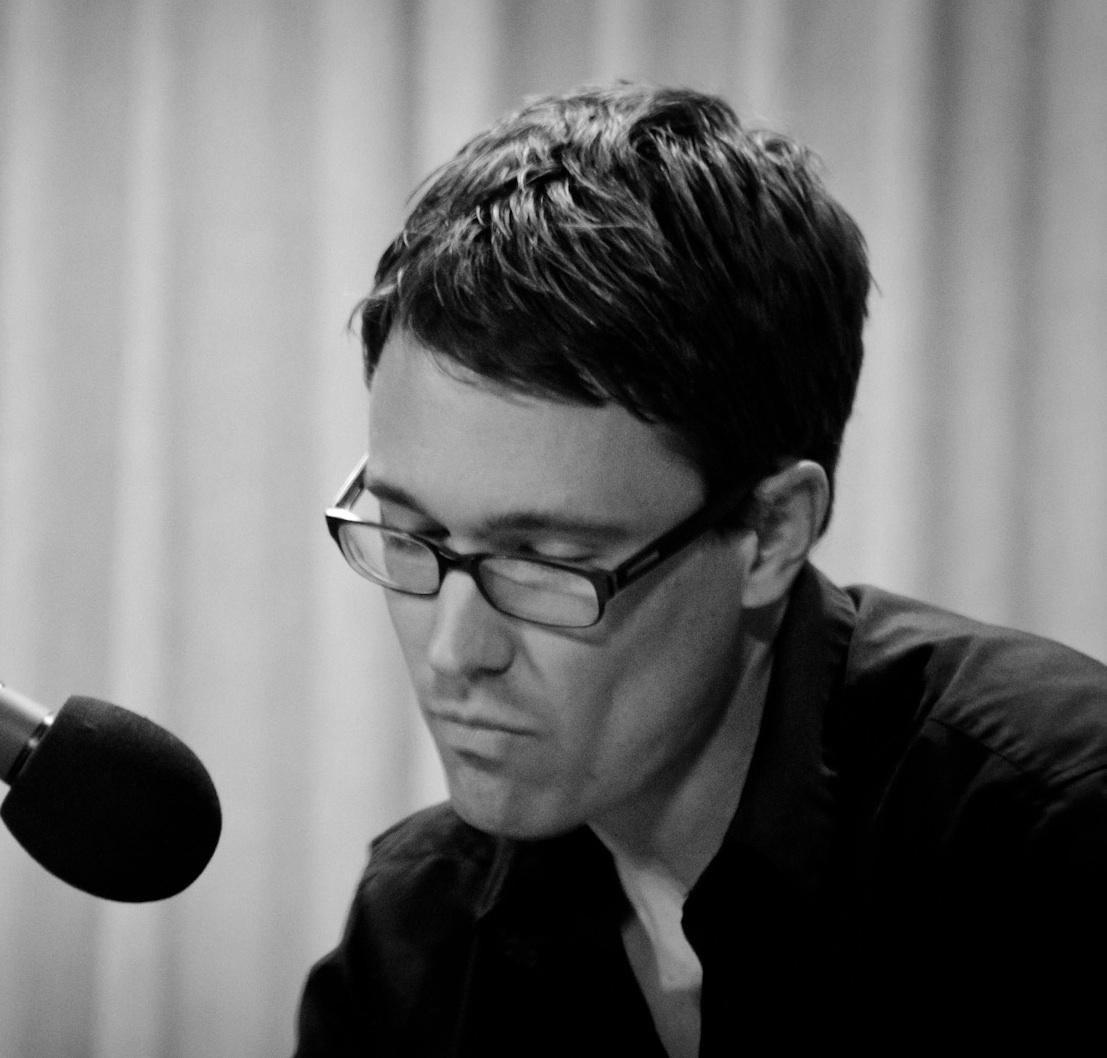
- Lavender-Smith reading at New Mexico State University
- Born: 1977 (age 48–49)
- Education: University of California, Berkeley (BA); New Mexico State University (MFA)
- Occupations: Writer; editor; professor
- Writing career
- Notable works: From Old Notebooks, Avatar
- Website: el-s.net

Evan Lavender-Smith (born 1977) is an American writer, editor, and professor.

Lavender-Smith was raised in Las Cruces, New Mexico. He received a BA in English from the University of California, Berkeley in 1999 and an M.F.A. in Fiction from New Mexico State University in 2004. He is the founding editor of Noemi Press and the former Editor-in-Chief of Puerto del Sol. He teaches in the MFA program in creative writing at Virginia Tech.

== Books ==
=== From Old Notebooks (2010) ===
Lavender-Smith's first book, From Old Notebooks, a cross-genre work combining elements of fiction, non-fiction, memoir, poetry and philosophy, was published in March 2010. Writing in Rain Taxi, literary critic and Harvard University professor Stephen Burt called From Old Notebooks "an anti-masterpiece of an anti-novel," noting novelist David Markson's influence on the book. In TriQuarterly, Barry Silesky wrote that From Old Notebooks "defies placement in a genre ... It is structured like poetry, in shifting events and tones without transition, though ... the language is ruthlessly prosaic." Daniel Nester has referred to Lavender-Smith's From Old Notebooks, along with books by Jenny Boully, as combining "the best of the poetics of prose poetry with the I-centric essay," and counted Lavender-Smith and Boully as members of a "New Prose" movement in contemporary American literature.

=== Avatar (2011) ===
Lavender-Smith's second book, a short novel entitled Avatar, was published in February 2011. The novel consists of a monologue thought or spoken by a character floating in space, between two points of light or "stars."

== Bibliography ==
- From Old Notebooks. Ann Arbor: Dzanc Books. 2013. ISBN 9781938604324.
- Avatar. Pittsburgh: Six Gallery Press. 2011. ISBN 9781926616162.

== Interviews ==
- “Speeds and Shapes of Consciousness” by David Winters in Gorse
- “An Interview with Evan Lavender-Smith by Edwin Turner at Biblioklept
- "An Interview with Evan Lavender-Smith" by Robert Lopez at Bookslut
- "What is Experimental Literature? {Five Questions: Evan Lavender-Smith}" by Christopher Higgs at HTMLGiant
- "Interstellar Overdrive: An Interview with Evan Lavender-Smith" by Dylan Hicks in Rain Taxi
- "The Conceptual Novel" by Michael Kimball at The Faster Times
- "Writers Respond: An Interview with Evan Lavender-Smith" by Molly Gaudry at HTMLGiant

== Reviews ==
From Old Notebooks

- “From Old Notebooks’’ by Stephen Thomas in Black Warrior Review
- “I Anti-Review Evan Lavender-Smith's Anti-Novel, From Old Notebooks” by Edwin Turner at Biblioklept
- “From Old Notebooks by Evan Lavender-Smith by Barry Silesky in TriQuarterly
- “From Old Notebooks” by Kevin Evers at The Rumpus
- “From Old Notebooks by Evan Lavender-Smith” by Callista Buchen in Prick of the Spindle
- “From Old Notebooks” by Peter Tieryas at HTMLGiant
- “A Thought Documentary” by Michael Filippone at Red Fez

Avatar

- “Black Space’’ by Gabriel Blackwell in American Book Review
- “Avatar Isn’t Just a Movie’’ by Giancarlo DiTrapano at Vice
- “Evan Lavender-Smith’s Avatar’’ by Mike Meginnis at Uncanny Valley
