= Happy Trails =

Happy Trails is an expression of good wishes for somebody departing. It may refer to:

- "Happy Trails" (song), the theme song of The Roy Rogers Show
- Happy Trails (album), a 1968 album by Quicksilver Messenger Service
- Happy Trails Highway, portion of California State Route 18 near home of Roy Rogers and Dale Evans
- Happy Trails (video game), a 1983 video game by Activision
- Happy Trails!, the eighth published collection of Bloom County cartoons, by Berke Breathed
- Happy Trails to You: Stories, 2008 collection of short stories by Julie Hecht.

== See also ==
- Bon voyage
- Happy trail
