= Michael Kimball =

American writer

- Born: February 1, 1967 (age 59); Lansing, Michigan, U.S.
- Education: Michigan State University; New York University
- Occupation: Novelist
- Years active: 2000–present
- Website: http://www.michaelkimball.com

Michael Kimball (born February 1, 1967) is an American novelist.

== Life and career ==
Michael Kimball was born February 1, 1967, in Lansing, Michigan. He studied at Michigan State University and New York University, and now lives in Baltimore, Maryland.

Kimball is a founding editor of Taint Magazine, He is the author of The Way the Family Got Away (2000); How Much of Us There Was (2005), released in the U.S. as Us (2011); Dear Everybody (2008); and Big Ray (2012). He has also published the book Words (2010) under the conceptual pseudonym Andy Devine. Kimball's literary works have been recognized and highlighted at Michigan State University in their Michigan Writers Series.

Kimball is the recipient of a grant from the New York Foundation for the Arts, a Boswell and Johnson Award, and the Lidano Fiction Prize.

His short fiction has also appeared in numerous literary magazines, including Open City, Prairie Schooner, Post Road and Gigantic (magazine). Sam Lipsyte (author of Home Land, The Subject Steve, and Venus Drive) calls Kimball "a hero of contemporary fiction."

Kimball is responsible for a collaborative art project, "Michael Kimball Writes Your Life Story (on a postcard)", which he performs at festivals; the project was covered in The Guardian. Kimball was also featured on NPR's All Things Considered.

Working with Luca Dipierro, Kimball produced two documentaries, I Will Smash You (2009) and 60 Writers/60 Places (2010).

=== Novels ===
Big Ray was published in 2012. Sam Lipsyte, author of The Ask, says Michael Kimball has been writing innovative, compelling and beautifully felt books for years, but Big Ray seems a break-through and culmination all at once. It's funny and terrifying and it's his masterpiece, at least so far.” Jon McGregor, author of This Isn’t the Sort of Thing That Happens to Someone Like You, calls Big Ray “An uncompromising work of power and grace. I finished reading it a week ago, but I still can't put it down."

Us was published by Tyrant Books in 2011. The novel was originally published in the UK as How Much of Us There Was. Us was called ""The best little novel you haven't heard about” by Oprah's Reading List. Time Out Chicago gave Us 5 stars: "The sentences and even paragraphs simulate the stunned but dutiful response to the suffering of a loved one: short, raw and somewhat elliptical, wrapping themselves around the small tasks at hand and the larger questions constantly raised. ... Kimball’s short chapters cast such a hypnotic spell, the reader is able to plug directly into the character’s grief. It’s a simply gorgeous and astonishing book, the kind that makes the outside world disappear once you open its pages."

Dear Everybody (2008) was published in the US and Canada, and in the UK, Australia, and South Africa. It has been translated into Greek, Korean, Chinese-Complex, and Chinese-Simplified. Dear Everybody developed from a short story published in Post Road Magazine called "Excerpts from the Suicide Letters of Jonathon Bender (b. 1967-d.2000)." Both Stephen King and Dave Eggers selected it for their lists of notables in The Best American Series Best American Short Stories and Best American Non-Required Reading. Time Out-New York says that Dear Everybody includes "stunning prose" and that the letters "harbor such a strange emotional power that you’ll find them hard to forget." The LA Times comments: "There is a whole life contained in this slim novel, a life as funny and warm and sad and heartbreaking as any other, rendered with honest complexity and freshness by Kimball's sharp writing." Jonathon Bender, the main character, had something to say, but the world wouldn’t listen. That’s why he writes to everybody he has ever known—including his mother and father, his brother and other relatives, his childhood friends and neighbors, the Tooth Fairy, his classmates and teachers, his psychiatrists, his ex-girlfriends and his ex-wife, the state of Michigan, a television station, and a weather satellite. Taken together, these unsent letters tell the remarkable story of Jonathon’s life. Christine Schutt, author of Florida, writes of Dear Everybody that “In Bender’s unsent letters of apology or thanks, Michael Kimball transforms the familiar into the strange again and the simplest confessions are made moments of sublime wonder.” Italian filmmaker and artist Luca Dipierro made a short film based on Dear Everybody.

Kimball's second novel, How Much of Us There Was, is the story about a man's love for his wife as she dies and how he attempts to manage his grief. Meanwhile, their adult grandson learns from them what real love is. Rebecca Seal, in The Observer, called it "powerful and moving." Mariko Kato in Time Out London observes: "A deep love between an aging husband and wife is given a heartbreaking voice in Michael Kimball’s second novel … Told through the eyes of the husband, the story is tender and poignant. His despair moves us because it is neither fantastic nor indulgent." Betty Williams of Telegraph & Argus writes, "This is the saddest book I have ever read and one of the most beautiful and unusual."

Kimball's first novel, The Way the Family Got Away, is the story of a family who suffers from the tragedy of an infant son dying. Told from the alternating perspectives of the surviving boy and girl, the novel takes the reader on an emotional journey across the American landscape, as both children try, in their different ways, to reconcile what their family was with what it has become. The Times called Kimball's novel "moving and clever: the open road, so long a symbol of freedom and self-discovery in American fiction, is here rendered as denuded of promise, embodying desertion, desolation and rootlessness. ... Kimball’s novel reads as parable about the death of the family, of how impossible family life is in a numbedly materialistic society.”

The Way has been translated into Italian, Dutch, German, Portuguese, Spanish, and Hebrew.
