= Greg Mulcahy =

American novelist and short-story writer

- Born: 1958 (age 67–68); St. Paul, Minnesota
- Occupations: Novelist, short-story writer

Greg Mulcahy is an American novelist and short-story writer.

== Early life ==
Mulcahy was born in St. Paul, Minnesota in 1958.

== Career ==
Mulcahy's collection Out of Work was published by Alfred A. Knopf in 1993. It included a novella, Glass.

His first novel, Constellation, was published in 1996.

A second collection of stories, Carbine, was released in 2010 by University of Massachusetts Press as part of its Juniper Prize for Fiction series.

A second novel, O'Hearn, was released in 2015. Kirkus Reviews called it "an inventive but ultimately thin portrayal of workplace despair."

His short fiction appeared frequently in Gordon Lish's The Quarterly and frequently appears in Diane Williams's NOON. His fiction has also been featured in such journals as Elimae, New York Tyrant, Caliban, The Gettysburg Review, Juked, Alice Blue Review, Sidebrow, Five Rrope, and Word Riot.
