= Noon (magazine) =

American literary magazine

- Editor: Diane Williams
- Frequency: Annual
- Founder: Diane Williams
- Founded: 2000
- Company: Noon, Inc.
- Country: United States
- Based in: New York City
- Language: English
- Website: noonannual.com
- ISSN: 1526-8055

NOON is a literary annual magazine founded in 2000 by American author Diane Williams. NOON Inc. launched its 24th edition in March 2023. NOON publishes fiction and occasional essays. It is archived at The Lilly Library along with the personal literary archive of founding editor Diane Williams. The Lilly is the principal rare books, manuscripts, and special collections repository of Indiana University.

NOON's editors include Diane Williams, Christine Schutt, Zach Davidson, Madelaine Lucas, Liza St. James, Rita Bullwinkel, Hilary Leichter, Rebekah Bergman, and Mary South.

== Contents ==
NOON has published stories by Tao Lin, Garielle Lutz, Dawn Raffel, Sam Lipsyte, Ottessa Moshfegh, Roxane Gay, Dylan Nice, Anya Yurchyshyn, Rhoads Stevens, Annie DeWitt, Karl Roloff, and R.O. Kwon, and regularly publishes Christine Schutt, Deb Olin Unferth, Clancy Martin, Lydia Davis, Rebecca Curtis, Brandon Hobson, Kathryn Scanlan, Greg Mulcahy, Vi Khi Nao, Kim Chinquee, Souvankham Thammavongsa, Susan Laier, Rob Walsh, Ashton Politanoff, Lucie Elven, Kayla Blatchley, Nathan Dragon, Marc Tweed, Tetman Callis, Robert Tindall, and others. The journal has published original drawings by Raymond Pettibon and regularly publishes drawings by Augusta Gross and photographs by Bill Hayward, as well as translations by Lydia Davis.

Several NOON contributors have published debut, critically acclaimed short story collections in 2020: Souvankham Thammavongsa, with How To Pronounce Knife (Little, Brown and Company); Kathryn Scanlan, with The Dominant Animal (MCD/FSG, 2020); and Mary South, with You Will Never Be Forgotten (FSG Originals).

== Awards ==
NOON stories have won numerous awards and prizes, including:

- Kim Chinquee’s "Formation" - 2007 Pushcart Prize
- Christine Schutt’s "The Duchess of Albany" - 2007 O. Henry Prize
- Clancy Martin’s "The Best Jeweler" - 2008 Pushcart Prize
- Lydia Davis's "We Had Wondered What Animal Might Arrive" - 2009 Pushcart Prize. She was also a 2007 National Book Award Fiction Finalist for her collection of stories Varieties of Disturbance. Seven of those stories appeared in previous editions of NOON.
- Deb Olin Unferth's "Likable" - 2014 Pushcart Prize, "Pet" - 2010 Pushcart Prize, "Juan the Cell Phone Salesman" - 2005 Pushcart Prize
- Joanna Ruocco's "If the Man Took" - 2014 Pushcart Prize
- Lincoln Michel's "If It Were Anyone Else' - 2015 Pushcart Prize
- Brandon Hobson's "Past the EconoLodge" - 2016 Pushcart Prize
- Stephen Hess's "Act" - 2018 Pushcart Prize
- Kim Chinquee's "I Figure" - 2019 Pushcart Prize
- Darrell Kinsey's "Upright at Thyatira" - 2021 Pushcart Prize

== Critical response ==
For The New Yorker in October 2021, Merve Emre wrote, “NOON publishes the most interesting short-story writers working in English.”

In January 2016, Rachel Syme of The New York Times described the magazine as "a beautiful annual that remains staunchly avant-garde in its commitment to work that is oblique, enigmatic and impossible to ignore. . .stories that leave a flashbulb's glow behind the eyes even as they resist sense."

In 2007, Deb Olin Unferth told Bookslut that NOON founder and editor Diane Williams "inspires excellence and demands discipline. More than an editor, she is an editor-artist."

In the May/June 2014 issue of Poets & Writers, Travis Kurowski wrote, "NOON contains prose chiseled to its barest, most arresting essence--a concision attributed by most to Williams's high demands as an editor."

In the Los Angeles Times on March 19, 2013, David Ulin wrote, "The new issue of Noon landed last week, and as usual, it’s a compendium of unlikely pleasures: short prose and illustrations that challenge us to think about meaning and narrative. The brainchild of fiction writer Diane Williams, who edits it, Noon has been around since 2000, publishing a single issue annually; it is elegantly designed and curated, a journal that wears its intentions on its sleeve....These are oblique stories, stories that exist in the interior, getting at the things we know but do not know we know."

The Times Literary Supplement reviewed NOON in its Learned Journals section on October 30, 2009. Alison Kelly wrote, "[T]he best stories in NOON are, indeed, stunning, in the sense that they leave one conscious of powerful meanings not yet fully absorbed. ... [T]he journal has proved its staying power and achieved a respected position. . . NOON has intellectual weight. Over the years it has investigated, and pushed the boundaries of, the means and processes of communication. ... Williams's editorial vision ensures the intelligence and integrity of the journal as a whole."

Kevin Sampsell described the magazine as a "beautifully-produced literary journal that features the strongest offbeat writing from a select group of literary stylists."

In The New York Sun, Benjamin Lytal called NOON "One of American fiction's finest and most focused journals."

Library Journal wrote that "NOON sets itself apart from the crowded field of literary journals with the quality of its submissions, its clean, easy-to-read design, and eye-catching cover. This independent, not-for-profit annual features essays, fiction, interviews, art, and translation that are as diverse as its contributors, who are both published and previously unpublished and come from international backgrounds. The editors of NOON adeptly select innovative, original, and highly readable work."

Christopher Frizzelle, editor of The Stranger, wrote "Noon, another literary journal that belongs on the list of literary journals that don't suck. The downside to Noon is that it only comes out once a year. The upshots are that Noon has a serif font, crisp photos, and excellent writing, or at least writing by writers I love."

Time Out New York said "Even if it shares some authors with mainstream publishers, Noon still shimmers with courage, strangeness and unknown voices" and that editor Diane Williams "has a penchant for devout stylists and squirm-inducing topics."

The magazine has been described as a "beautifully-produced literary journal that features the strongest offbeat writing from a select group of literary stylists."

== See also ==
- List of literary magazines
