= Roberta Allen =

American conceptual artist and fiction writer (b. 1945)

- Born: 1945 (age 80–81); New York, NY
- Occupations: Conceptual artist; Fiction writer
- Writing career
- Period: 1960s–present
- Website: www.robertaallen.com

Roberta Allen is a conceptual artist, and fiction writer who explores ways in which language changes or informs perception of images. She is known for her multi-media conceptual works. She has appeared in over one hundred group exhibitions worldwide.

== Early life and travels ==
Allen was born and raised in New York NY. At the age of twenty, she traveled alone to Europe and lived briefly in Athens, Amsterdam and Berlin, and later in Mexico. Over the years, she has traveled, often alone, to the Peruvian Amazon, Indonesia, Turkey, Egypt, Mali, and countries in Central America. Her travels have inspired many of her stories.

== Art career ==
Allen is known for her conceptual works, which combine image and text, and include drawings, collages, artist books, photo/text series, sculpture and installations. Her works in the early 1970s were inspired by Kierkegaard’s belief that our deepest experiences occur in the form of contradictions, and that wherever there is contradiction, humor is present. Through the 1970s, she exhibited alongside Sol LeWitt, Robert Ryman and Carl Andre, among others, at John Weber Gallery in New York.

Allen began as a painter in Amsterdam, where she had her first one-person gallery exhibition in 1967. After several one-person shows in New York, she joined John Weber Gallery in 1973 and had one-person exhibitions there in 1974, 1975, 1977 and 1979. She also had one-person gallery exhibitions in the 1970s in Milan, Düsseldorf, Brussels, Munich and Rome, and one-person museum exhibitions at MoMA PS1, L.I.C., NY, in 1977, 80; the Kunstforum, Städtische Galerie in Lenbachhaus, Munich, in 1981, and the Perth Institute of Contemporary Arts, Perth, Western Australia, in 1989.

After 1981 she preferred to stay outside the art world, while continuing to make conceptual art and occasionally exhibiting. In 2014, the Athenaeum Music & Arts Library in La Jolla, California, began a catalogue raisonné of her 1970s artist books. A one-person exhibition of her 1970s art was presented at Minus Space in Dumbo, Brooklyn, and a one-person show of recent conceptual drawings and one-of-a-kind artist books at the Athenaeum in 2016. A one-person exhibition, "Some Facts About Fear," was presented in 2017 in Minus Space in Brooklyn.

== Writing career ==
Allen has published, among other books, three micro and short story collections, a novel, a novella and a travel memoir. In her writing, she questions the way in which we perceive the world and the self, and she considers the way our minds work and the act of relating. Her interest in language is the bridge that connects these separate artistic pursuits

She began writing fiction in 1979 while making conceptual art. Her first stories were published in 1980 by Sun & Moon Press in the anthology Contemporary American Fiction, along with John Ashbery and Walter Abish, among others. Her first story collection was The Traveling Woman, (Vehicle Editions). Her other books are The Daughter, (Autonomedia), Certain People, (Coffee House Press); Amazon Dream (City Lights) Fast Fiction, (Story Press), The Playful Way to Serious Writing, The Playful Way to Knowing Yourself, (both Houghton Mifflin) and The Dreaming Girl (Painted Leaf, new edition Ellipsis Press). Her latest story collection is The Princess of Herself, published by Pelekinesis Press in 2017.

Her short shorts and short stories have appeared in over 300 literary magazines, including Conjunctions, Guernica, Bomb, The Brooklyn Rail, Open City, The Collagist, Gargoyle and in many anthologies, including Micro Fiction (magazine)|Micro Fiction, published by W.W. Norton in 2017.

She received the 2015 Honorable Mention for The Gertrude Stein Award for Fiction. She has been a Tennessee Williams Fellow in Fiction at the University of the South and a Yaddo Fellow.

== Selected one person exhibitions ==
- 2017 Minus Space, Brooklyn, NY
- 2016 Athenaeum Music & Arts Library, La Jolla, CA.
- 2014 Minus Space, Brooklyn, NY
- 1989 Perth Institute of Contemporary Arts, Perth, Western Australia
- 1981 Galerie Walter Storms, Munich, Germany
- 1981 Kunstforum, Stadt. Galerie im Lembachhaus, Munich, Germany
- 1981 Galleria Primo Piano, Rome, Italy
- 1980 P.S. 1 Museum, Long Island City, NY
- 1979 John Weber Gallery, NYC
- 1978 Hal Bromm Gallery, NYC
- 1978 MTL Galerie, Brussels, Belgium
- 1978 Fine Arts Center, C.W. Post College, Glenvale, LI., NY
- 1977 Galerie Maier-Hahn, Dusseldorf, Germany
- 1977 John Weber Gallery, NYC
- 1977 Franklin Furnace, NYC
- 1977 P.S. 1 Museum, Long Island City, NY
- 1975 John Weber Gallery, NYC
- 1974 John Weber Gallery, NYC
- 1974 Galleria Toselli, Milan, Italy
- 1967 Galerie 845, Amsterdam, Netherlands

== Grants and fellowships ==
- 2017-18 Long-listed for the Gordon Burn Prize for The Princess of Herself
- 2017 Tree of Life Artist Grant
- 2010 Virginia Center For The Creative Arts, Residency Fellowship, Amherst, VA
- 2005 Virginia Center For The Creative Arts, Residency Fellowship, Amherst, VA
- 1998 Tennessee Williams Fellow In Creative Writing/Writer In Residence, University of the South, Sewanee, TN
- 1994 Virginia Center For The Creative Arts, Residency Fellowship, Amherst, VA
- 1993 Yaddo Residency Fellowship, Saratoga Springs, New York
- 1989 Artist-In-Residence Fellowship, Art Gallery of Western Australia, Perth, Western Australia
- 1987 Yaddo Residency Fellowship, Saratoga Springs, New York
- 1986 Virginia Center For The Creative Arts, Residency Fellowship, Amherst, VA
- 1985 VCCA Residency Feliowship
- 1985 LINE (NEA & NYS Council) Grant
- 1983 Yaddo Residency Fellowship
- 1978-79 CAPS (Creative Artists Public Service) Grant (Sculpture)
- 1972 Ossabaw Island Project Residency Fellowship
- 1971-72 MacDowell Colony Residency Fellowship

== Multiple edition artist books ==
- Some Facts About Fear, published by the artist, Rome, 1981, limited edition
- Everything in the world there is to know is known by somebody, but not by the same knower, Ottenhausen Verlag, Munich, 1981, edition of 300
- Possibilities, John Weber Gallery & Parasol Press, 1977, edition of 1000
- Pointless Acts, Collation Center, NY 1977, edition of 1000
- Pointless Arrows, published by the artist, 197G, edition of 1000
- Partially Trapped Lines, Parasol Press, SA, 1975, limited edition of 200
- The Invisible Line of Limitation, Parasol Press, SA, 1975, limited edition of 200

== Selected bibliography ==
- Silverblatt, Michael, "Roberta Allen: The Princess of Herself," Bookworm, KCRW Los Angeles, CA, March 22, 2018, live and online.
- Torri, Erika, Roberta Allen, Artists' Books Collection, Athenaeum Music & Arts Library, La Jolla, CA., May 2017, 64 pages.
- Zinnser, John, "Writing Anti-Stories: An Interview with Roberta Allen," Bomb Magazine, (Online), Oct. 11, 2017
- Seed, John, Clusters of Loose Geometries in Conceptual "Thought Drawings," Roberta Allen (Review), Hyperallergic, Nov. 10, 2016 online.
- Catalog of exhibition, Un Museo Ideale: The Collection of Bianca & Mario Bertolini, Museo del Novecento, Milan, Italy, 2015.
- Goodrich, Melissa, (Online Interview) "The Hair Stylist Who Fell Twenty Feet And Landed Upright: An Interview with Roberta Allen," The Collagist Blog, Dzanc Books, Jan. 22, 2014
- Vartanian, Hrag, Best of 2014: Our Top 10 Brooklyn Art Shows: #2 Roberta Allen: Works from the 1970s at Minus Space, Hyperallergic, Dec. 23, 2014, online.
- McConnell, Suzanne, “The Dreaming Girl,” Web Exclusive, The Brooklyn Rail, Feb. 2012
- Wynn Kramarshy / Amy Eshoo, Editor, 560 BROADWAy: A New York Drawing Collection at Work, 1991-2006, Fifth Floor Foundation with Yale University Press, 2008, pp 161, 177.
- Indiana, Gary, “Have Pain Will Travel.” The Village Voice, Books, December 23, 1986, 72.
- “Metaphor in Midocean.” “Noted With Pleasure,” (Excerpt) The New York Times Book Review, June 22, 1986, 39.
- Erweiteerte Fotografie/Extended Photography, catalog of exhibition at Wiener Secession, Vienna, Austria, 1981
- Rein, Ingrid, Paradoxa mit Pfeil und Fisch, Die Installationen von Roberta Allen, Süddeutsche Zeitung, April 27, 1981
- Skira Annuel, Art Actuel, 1979, Geneva, Statement by the artist, p 32
- O'Grady, Holly, The Paradoxical Arrow: Roberta Allen's Installations And Books, (article), Arts Magazine, February 1979, pp 156,157
- Lopes Cardozo, Judith, Roberta Allen (review) Artforum, February 1978, pp 73, 74
- Lubell, Ellen, Roberta Allen (review) Arts Magazine, October 1977, pp 23,24
- Deitch, Jeffrey, Roberta Allen, (article), Arts Magazine, June 1977, p 6
- Auping, Michael, New Work/New York catalog of exhibition at California State University, Los Angeles, 1976.
- Lubell, Ellen, Alighiero E. Boetti/Roberta Allen (review), Arts Magazine, April 1975, pp 19, 20
- Gilbert-Rolfe, Jeremy, Roberta Allen (review), Artforum, May 1974, p 69

== Selected public collections ==
- Museum of Modern Art, NYC
- The Metropolitan Museum of Art, NYC
- The Cooper-Hewitt Museum, NYC
- Bibliothèque du France, Paris, France
- Cincinnati Art Museum, Cincinnati, Ohio
- Worcester Art Museum, Worcester, MA
- Stadtische Galerie im Lenbachhaus, Munich, Germany
- Art Gallery of Western Australia, Perth, Western Australia
- Wadsworth Athenaeum, Hartford, CT.
- Athenaeum, Music & Arts Library, La Jolla, CA
- Museo del Novecento, Milan, Italy

== Teaching (writing) ==
Teaching positions include: The Writing Program, New School University from 1992 – 2010, Columbia University's School of the Arts, University of the South, Sewanee, TN, Parsons School of Design, NY, Summer Writers' Conference, Hofstra University, International Women's Writing Guild Conference, Skidmore College, Saratoga Springs, NY. Allen's private writing workshops began in 1991 and continue to the present.
