= Kathryn Scanlan =

American writer

- In a 2023 interview
- Born: 1980 (age 45–46); Iowa, US
- Education: University of Iowa; School of the Art Institute of Chicago
- Occupation: Writer
- Notable work: Aug 9 – Fog (2019), Kick the Latch (2022)
- Awards: Gordon Burn Prize, Windham-Campbell Prize

Kathryn Scanlan (born 1980) is an American writer. She has published two novels and a collection of short stories. Her fiction often reworks non-fictional source material, including interviews and found texts. She has won the Gordon Burn Prize and the Windham-Campbell Prize.

== Life and education ==
Scanlan was born in Iowa in 1980. She grew up in rural eastern Iowa. Her mother's family were farmers, her father's family racehorse trainers.

Scanlan studied literature and art at the University of Iowa, then did an MFA in writing at the School of the Art Institute of Chicago.

She lives in Los Angeles.

== Career ==
Scanlan's first published short story was "Line", which appeared in NOON Annual in 2009. NOON founder and editor Diane Williams became a mentor for Scanlan and NOON published more of Scanlan's fiction throughout the 2010s, including excerpts from the material that would later became her first book, Aug 9 – Fog. Scanlan's story "The Old Mill" was published in The Iowa Review and won the 2010 Iowa Review Fiction Prize. Other stories appeared in Tin House, from which she received a scholarship to attend the 2013 Tin House Summer Workshop, Fence, and American Short Fiction.

Scanlan published her first full-length work, Aug 9 – Fog, in 2019. The book is based on a diary that Scanlan found at an estate auction. The diary belonged to an elderly Iowan woman, and covers the years 1968 to 1972. Scanlan selected fragments from the 400 pages of the diary and rearranged them to form a narrative arc, ordered in five seasonal sections. In an essay published in The Paris Review in 2019, Scanlan described how she later tracked down the diarist on Find A Grave and found out that she had died at the age of 95, four years after the diary ends.

Scanlan's collection of short stories, The Dominant Animal, was published in 2020. Containing 40 very short stories, it focuses on the relationship between humans and the natural world, especially animals. The collection continues Scanlan's mixing of genres, with some stories reworked from found texts and conversations, including an old book about Queen Victoria and Prince Albert and a conversation with a bus driver.

Scanlan's second novel, Kick the Latch, was published in 2022. It is based on interviews Scanlan conducted with Iowa-born horse trainer Sonia, a family friend. These were carried out in person and then, during the COVID-19 pandemic, over the phone. The interview material is extensively reworked to form a linear narrative of the trainer's life, from birth to retirement, rendered in short chapters arranged in numbered sections.

In March 2024, Kick the Latch won the Gordon Burn Prize.

In April 2024, Scanlan was awarded the $175,000 Windham-Campbell Prize.

== Other work ==
Scanlan has also published art criticism and essays in Artforum and Another Gaze.

== Awards ==
- 2021 American Academy of Arts and Letters Arts and Letters Award: Literature
- 2024 Gordon Burn Prize
- 2024 Windham-Campbell Prize

== Bibliography ==
- Aug 9 – Fog, MCD/FSG, 2019. ISBN 978-0374106874
- The Dominant Animal, MCD x FSG Originals, 2020. ISBN 978-0374538293
- Kick the Latch, New Directions, 2022. ISBN 978-0811232005
