= Galef =

Galef is a surname of Ashkenazic origin. Notable people with the surname include:

- David Galef (born 1959), American writer and poet
- Julia Galef (born 1983), American writer, speaker, rationalist, and sceptic
- Sandy Galef (born 1940), American politician
