= Lincoln Michel =

American short story writer and editor (born 1982)

- Born: 1982 (age 43–44); Virginia, U.S.
- Education: Columbia University (MFA)
- Writing career
- Genres: science fiction, weird fiction, nonfiction
- Website: www.lincolnmichel.com

Lincoln Michel (born 1982) is an American short story writer, novelist, essayist, and editor. He is the author of the short story collection Upright Beasts and the novels The Body Scout and Metallic Realms. His essays and criticism have appeared in The New York Times, GQ, BOMB, LitHub, and The Guardian.

== Early life and education ==
Lincoln Michel grew up outside of Charlottesville, Virginia. He received an MFA in Writing from Columbia University, where he studied under writers Sam Lipstye, Ben Marcus, and Rebecca Curtis.

He has received awards and residencies from The Millay Colony, VCCA, LMCC, The Mastheads, and Lighthouse Works.

== Career ==
Michel was the co-founder and co-editor of Gigantic. From 2014 to 2017, he was the Editor-in-Chief of Electric Literature. He is known for his "genre-bending" stories. His short stories have been published in Noon, The Paris Review, Granta, Tin House, Fantasy and Science Fiction, The Believer, and Lightspeed Magazine. He won a 2015 Pushcart Prize.

His debut novel, The Body Scout, was published in 2021 and received critical acclaim. The New York Times named the novel one of the ten best SFF books of 2021. The New York Times also called it "timeless and original" and "a wild ride, sad and funny, surreal and intelligent." Boing Boing described the book as "a modern cyberpunk classic." Esquire named it one of the 50 Best Science Fiction Books of All Time and called it: "A breathlessly paced techno-thriller characterized by stunning, spiky worldbuilding."

His third book, Metallic Realms, was named one of "The 35 Best Books of 2025" by Esquire.

Michel teaches speculative fiction writing at Columbia University School of the Arts and Sarah Lawrence College.

He is the author of the popular literary Substack newsletter "Counter Craft".

Michel and editor Nadxieli Nieto have co-edited three anthologies together. Their second anthology, Tiny Crimes: Very Short Tales of Mystery and Murder, was a finalist for the 2018 Shirley Jackson Award. Their third anthology, a book of horror flash fiction stories titled Tiny Nightmares: Very Short Tales of Horror, was a finalist for the 2020 Shirley Jackson Award.

== Personal life ==
He lives in Brooklyn, New York.

== Publications ==
=== Collections ===
- Upright Beasts. Coffee House Press. 2015. ISBN 9781566894180.

=== Novels ===
- The Body Scout. Orbit Books. 2021. ISBN 9780316628716.
- Metallic Realms. Simon & Schuster. 2025. ISBN 9781668058671.

=== Anthologies edited ===
- Lincoln Michel; Nadxieli Nieto, eds. (2015). Gigantic Worlds. Gigantic Books. ISBN 9780991189601.
- —; Nadxieli Nieto, eds. (2018). Tiny Crimes: Very Short Tales of Mystery and Murder. Catapult. ISBN 9781936787876.
- —; Nadxieli Nieto, eds. (2020). Tiny Nightmares: Very Short Tales of Horror. Catapult. ISBN 978-1948226622.
