= Luca Dipierro =

Italian animator and illustrator

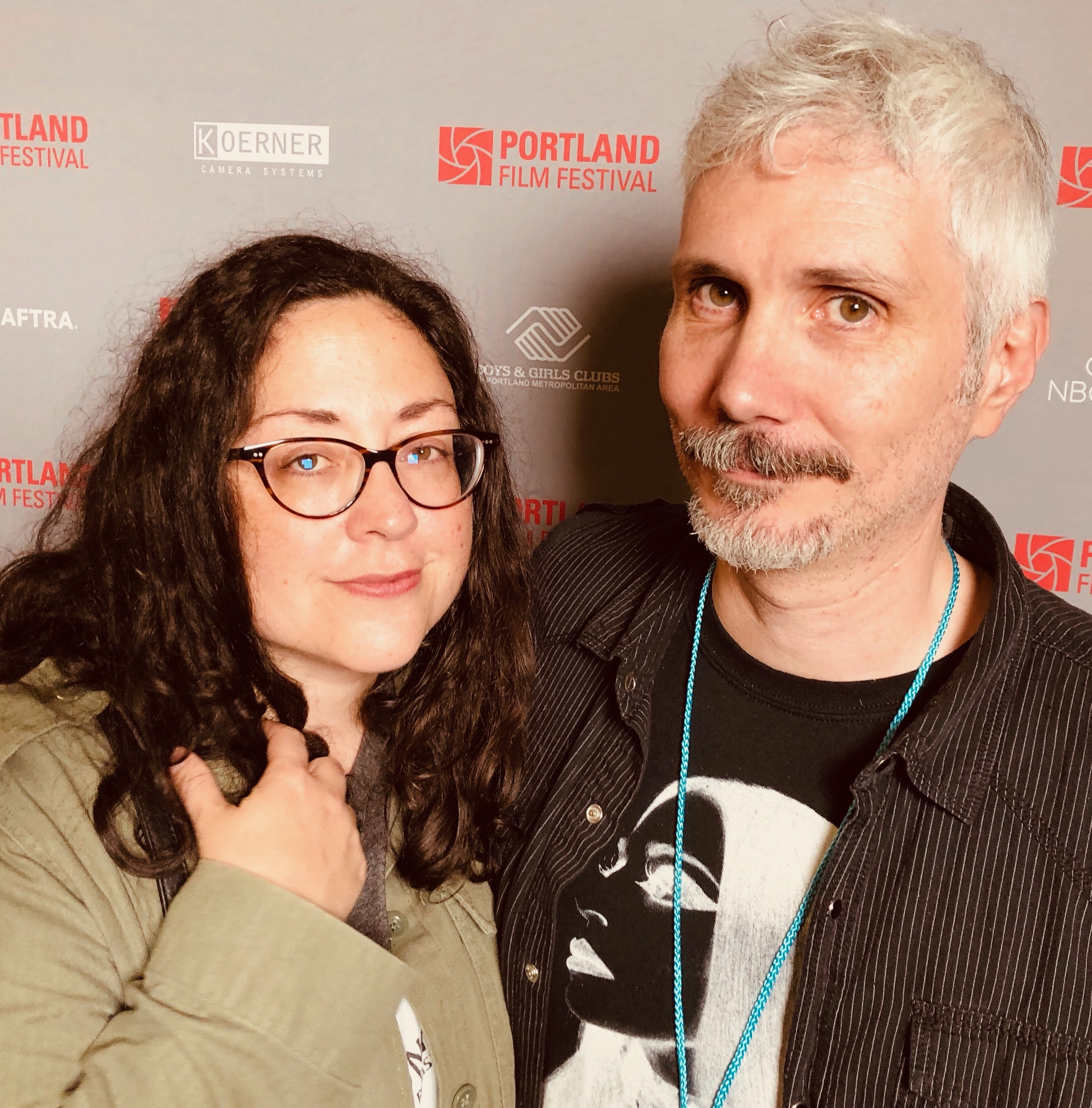
Dipierro (right) with author Leni Zumas at the 2018 edition of the Portland Film Festival

Luca Dipierro is an Italian artist, animator and writer born in Merano, in Northern Italy, and living in the United States. Dipierro's drawings have been used on numerous book and record covers. His cut-out animations, filmed in stop motion with marionettes made out of paper and old book cloth, have been called "a perfect balance of creepy and charming" (Huffington Post). His work has been shown in theaters, galleries, and film festivals in the United States and Europe: notably the Karlovy Vary International Film Festival, the Maggio Musicale Fiorentino, and the Portland Film Festival.

In a 2010 interview with Ken Baumann on HTMLGIANT, Dipierro referred to the painstaking quality of his own work as a "systematic, patient, scrupulous waste of time."

Dipierro currently lives in Portland, Oregon.

== Films ==
Since 2006, Dipierro has created numerous short animated films, some used as booktrailers for the work of writers such as C.A. Conrad, Mary Gaitskill, Tove Jansson, Jim Knipfel, Robert Lopez, Jenny Offil, Studs Terkel, and Leni Zumas. Between 2014 and 2015, Dipierro toured with the show Paper Circus, a screening of his animations with a live soundtrack performed with the Italian band Father Murphy. Paper Circus has been presented in various cinemas and galleries across the USA: the Hollywood Theatre and the Clinton Street Theatre in Portland, OR, Cinefamily at The Silent Movie Theatre in LA, the Grand Illusion Cinema in Seattle, WA, Spectacle Theater and Millennium Film Workshop in Brooklyn, NY and many others.

His latest animated film is called The Cadence, A Tale of Paper and Cloth, completed in 2022.

Dipierro was the subject of a 2011 documentary short film directed by American photographer McNair Evans.

== Publications ==
Dipierro is the author of the art-zine series Das Ding, published by The Walk; an illustrated novel in cards, A Wooden Leg, co-created with Leni Zumas (The Walk, 2014); and numerous art booklets. Dipierro has also published a book of short fictions in Italian, Biscotti neri (Madcap, 2011), described by Jim Knipfel as "dark, surreal, and extremely unsettling [...] folk tales of the future." Dipierro's prose in English has appeared in Gigantic, Harp and Altar, No Colony, New York Tyrant, PANK, the anthology City Sages Baltimore, and other publications. In 2024, Dipierro edited and translated into Italian and anthology of Frank Stanford's poetry, Acqua segreta, published by Interno Poesia.
