= The Unprofessionals =

- Author: Julie Hecht
- Language: English
- Genre: Fiction
- Published: September 2, 2003
- Publisher: Random House
- Publication place: United States
- Media type: Print, e-book
- Pages: 240 pages
- ISBN: 1400061741
- Preceded by: Was This Man a Genius?
- Followed by: Happy Trails to You: Stories

The Unprofessionals, also stylized as The Unprofessionals: A Novel, is the debut novel of American author Julie Hecht. The work was first published on September 2, 2003, through Random House and was reprinted in paperback in 2008 through Simon & Schuster. The book follows Isabelle, a freelance photographer first introduced in Hecht's 1997 short story collection Do the Windows Open?.

== Synopsis ==
Swiftly approaching her fiftieth year, Isabelle (who is never referred to by name in the novel) finds that she's becoming disconnected from the world around her and has increasing difficulty finding her purpose in life. Her only real outlet is her friendship with a young man she met years ago during a photoshoot with his father, a wealthy and powerful surgeon.

== Reception ==
Critical reception for The Unprofessionals has been positive. Richard Eder of the New York Times praised the work, comparing Hecht's writing to that of J. D. Salinger and stating that it had "beautifully contoured reflections". The Chicago Times also wrote a favorable review, writing that it was "a corrosive sendup of the way we live now, spun out by a modern loner who happens to be every bit as distressing as the benighted, T-shirt-wearing masses she rails against."
