= Lipsyte =

Lipsyte is a surname. Notable people with the surname include:

- Robert Lipsyte (born 1938), American sports journalist and author
- Sam Lipsyte (born 1968), American novelist and short story writer, son of Robert
