= Anne Valente =

American writer

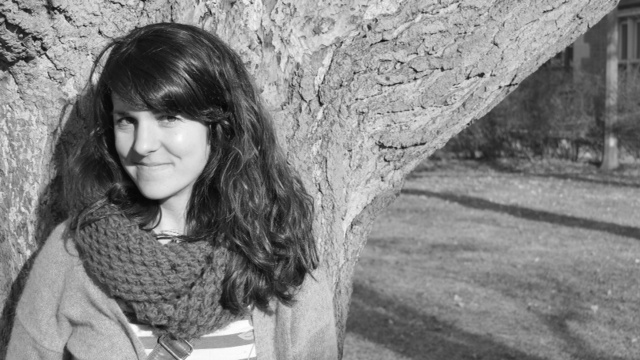
- Born: St. Louis, Missouri
- Education: Washington University in St. Louis (BA) University of Illinois (MS); Bowling Green State University (MFA) University of Cincinnati (PhD)
- Occupations: Short-story writer, essayist, novelist
- Writing career
- Language: English
- Notable works: Our Hearts Will Burn Us Down (2016) By Light We Knew Our Names (2014) An Elegy for Mathematics (2013)
- Notable awards: The Best Small Fictions (2017) Copper Nickel Prize (2012); Dzanc Short Story Prize (2011) Notable Story, Best American Non-Required Reading (2011)
- Website: www.annevalente.com

Anne Valente is an American writer. Her debut short story collection, By Light We Knew Our Names, won the Dzanc Books Short Story Prize and was released in September 2014. She is also the author of the fiction chapbook, An Elegy for Mathematics. Her fiction has appeared in One Story, Hayden's Ferry Review, Ninth Letter, The Kenyon Review and others. In 2014, She was the Georges and Anne Borchardt Scholar at the Sewanee Writers' Conference. Her essays have been published in The Believer, Electric Literature and The Washington Post.

In 2016, Valente's debut novel, Our Hearts Will Burn Us Down, was published by William Morrow/HarperCollins. Her second novel, The Desert Sky Before Us, was published by HarperCollins in 2019.

Valente is currently represented by Emma Patterson at Brandt & Hochman.

She has taught creative writing and creative non-fiction at Bowling Green State University, McNeese State University, University of Illinois at Urbana–Champaign, University of Utah, University of Cincinnati, and Santa Fe University of Art and Design.

Valente is currently an associate professor in the department of Literature and Creative Writing at Hamilton College.

== Awards ==
- 2017 A Personal History of Arson, The Best Small Fictions
- 2015 Featured Author, One Story Literary Debutante Ball
- 2014 Notable Debut Author, The Masters Review.
- 2012 Copper Nickel Short Story Prize
- 2011 Dzanc Books Short Story Prize

== Selected works ==
=== Books ===
- The Desert Sky Before Us (2019, William Morrow) ISBN 978-0062749871
- Our Hearts Will Burn Us Down (2016, William Morrow) ISBN 978-0062429117
- By Light We Knew Our Names (2014, Dzanc Books) ISBN 978-1-9368736-2-3
- An Elegy for Mathematics (2013, Origami Zoo Press; 2017 reissue, Bull City Press) ISBN 978-0988704404
