= Dawn Raffel =

American writer

Dawn Raffel is an American writer. She has authored two short story collections, a novel, a memoir, and a biography. Her work has appeared in The Quarterly, NOON, edited by Diane Williams, O, The Oprah Magazine, Conjunctions, Open City, Fence, Guernica, The Antioch Review, The Mississippi Review, The Brooklyn Rail, The Anchor Book of New American Short Fiction, Micro Fictions, BOMB, and numerous other publications.

== Works ==
- In the Year of Long Division (1995), a collection published by Alfred A. Knopf. One of the last books edited there by Gordon Lish.
- Carrying the Body (2002), a novel published by Scribner.
- Further Adventures in the Restless Universe (2010), a collection published by Dzanc Books.
- The Secret Life of Objects (2012), an illustrated memoir published by Jaded Ibis.
- The Strange Case of Dr. Couney: How a Mysterious European Showman Saved Thousands of American Babies (2018), a biography published by Blue Rider Press.

== Film ==
- The Myth of Drowning, a film by Steven Richter, based on the short story of the same name
