= Clancy Martin =

Canadian philosopher, novelist, and essayist

Clancy Martin is a Canadian philosopher, novelist, and essayist. His interests focus on 19th century philosophy, existentialism, moral psychology, philosophy and literature, ethics & behavioral health, applied and professional ethics (especially bioethics) and philosophy of mind.

A Guggenheim Fellow, Martin has authored and edited more than a dozen books in philosophy, including Love and Lies, Honest Work, Introducing Philosophy, Ethics Across the Professions and The Philosophy of Deception. He has written more than three hundred articles, essays and short pieces on Kierkegaard, Nietzsche, Romanticism, the virtue of truthfulness, and many other subjects, and has also translated works of Nietzsche and Kierkegaard from German and Danish, including a complete translation of Thus Spoke Zarathustra. Combining memoir with philosophical inquiry, Martin's book How Not to Kill Yourself: A Portrait of the Suicidal Mind, examines the author's own experiences with depression, substance abuse and suicide as well as exploring the philosophy of suicide. In the work, Martin also describes how he managed his own suicidal ideations and depression.

Martin is also a Pushcart Prize-winning fiction writer and author of two novels, How to Sell (2009) and Bad Sex (2015). In How to Sell, he portrays the luxury business as being one of exquisite vulgarity and outrageous fraud, finding in it a metaphor for the American soul at work. His novels have earned acclamation from publications such as Times Literary Supplement, The Guardian, L.A. Times, Publishers Weekly and The Kansas City Star.

His writing has appeared in The New Yorker, Harper's Magazine, The New Republic, The New York Times, The Wall Street Journal, The London Review of Books, The Atlantic, The Times Literary Supplement, Lapham's Quarterly, Ethics, The Believer, The Journal of the History of Philosophy, GQ, Esquire, Details, Elle, Travel + Leisure, Bookforum, Vice, Men's Journal, and many other newspapers, magazines and journals, and has been translated into more than thirty languages. He is a regular contributor to Diane Williams' literary annual NOON. He was a founding writer for The Small Bow, a publication focused on recovery.

Martin is Curators' Distinguished Professor of Philosophy at the University of Missouri in Kansas City, and is Professor of Business Ethics at the Henry W. Bloch School of Management (UMKC). He was also Professor of Philosophy at Ashoka University 2017-2025.

Martin has also won the Thomas Jefferson Award, The University of Missouri system's highest award, a German Academic Exchange Service Fellowship and many other awards and honors. He is a contributing editor at Harper's Magazine and Vice.

== Biography ==
Clancy Martin was born on May 7, 1967, as the middle child in a family of three boys. His father Bill was a type 1 diabetic, and a successful real estate developer in Toronto and Calgary, Canada. Bill became involved in New Age spirituality, founding a "Church of Living Love" in Palm Beach, Florida, in 1976. The church expanded to several locations before foundering. Bill would launch a number of such churches with ephemeral success. He (Bill) died in 1997 in the psychiatric ward of a hospital for indigent persons.

Martin earned his B.A. degree at Baylor University. He attended graduate school at University of Texas, Austin, in the philosophy department. He quit in the early 1990s to start a jewelry business with his older brother. He resumed his graduate studies after his father died in 1997. He received his PhD in philosophy from UT Austin in 2003. He then went on to teach at University of Missouri, Kansas City, where he is now Curators' Distinguished professor of philosophy; he chaired the Department of Philosophy from 2009 to 2013.

Martin is married to the celebrated writer Amie Barrodale.

== Bibliography ==
- Staying Alive: What the Existentialists Taught Me (New York: Liveright. Forthcoming, 2027)
- Beyond Good and Evil: A Commentary (AI Interactive Edition) (Santa Barbara: Rebind Publishing. Forthcoming, 2026)
- How Not to Kill Yourself: A Portrait of the Suicidal Mind (New York: Pantheon, 2023)
- Honest Work. With Joanne Ciulla and Robert C. Solomon (New York: Oxford University Press, 2006. 2/e 2010. 3/e 2014. 4/e 2018. 5/e 2022) ISBN 978-0190497682
- The Philosophy of Love and Sex. Edited with Carol Hay. New York: Oxford University Press, 2024.
- Ethics Across the Professions. With Robert C. Solomon and Wayne Vaught (New York: Oxford University Press. 2009. 2/e 2017. 3/e 2022) ISBN 978-0-19-532668-0
- Love and Lies: An Essay on Truthfulness, Deceit, and the Growth and Care of Erotic Love (New York: Farrar, Straus, and Giroux, 2015; Picador, 2016. London: Harvill Secker, 2015, Vintage, 2016) ISBN 978-1784700775
- Introducing Philosophy. With Kathleen Higgins and Robert C. Solomon. (New York: Oxford University Press. 9/e 2008, 10/e 2011. 11/e 2016. 12/e 2019) ISBN 978-0190939632
- The German Sisyphus: On the Happy Burden of Responsibility. With Andrew Bergerson, Steve Ostovich, and Scott Baker (New York and Berlin: De Gruyter, 2011)
- The Philosophy of Deception. Editor (New York: Oxford University Press, 2009) ISBN 9783110246360
- Since Socrates. With Robert C. Solomon (Belmont: Wadsworth, 2004) ISBN 978-0534633288
- Morality and The Good Life. With Robert C. Solomon (New York: McGraw Hill, 2003) 5/e with Robert C. Solomon and Wayne Vaught. 2009 ISBN 978-0-07-340742-5
- Above The Bottom Line: An Introduction to Business Ethics. With Robert C. Solomon (Belmont: Wadsworth, 2003) ISBN 978-0-15-505950-4

=== Fiction ===
- Bad Sex (New York: Tyrant Books, 2015). Also published in English—in a somewhat different form—as Travels in Central America (Milan: The Milan Review. 2012; in Italian as Adulterio in Central America (Rome: Indiana Editore, 2013). And as Love in Central America (London: Harvill Secker, 2016), and various other international publishers. ISBN 978-0991360802
- How to Sell (New York: Farrar, Straus and Giroux, 2009; Picador, 2010) Also appeared in German, French, Italian, Spanish, Korean, and Chinese. Optioned by Sony for film in 2011. Under development for television by Anonymous Content, with Martin as co-writer, executive producer and co-creator. ISBN 978-0312429645

=== Major translation ===
- Friedrich Nietzsche,Thus Spoke Zarathustra: A Commentary and New Translation (AI Interactive Edition) (Santa Barbara: Rebind Publishing, 2024)
- Friedrich Nietzsche, Thus Spoke Zarathustra (New York: Barnes and Noble Classics, 2005)

== Reviews ==
- Zach Baron Wednesday (May 20, 2009). "Diamonds Are Whatever: Clancy Martin's How to Sell". The Village Voice. Archived from the original on May 25, 2009.
- Catherine Taylor (27 June 2009). "How to Sell". The Guardian.
- Lincoln Michel (Jun 2, 2009). "How to Sell by Clancy Martin". Bookforum.

== Selected awards ==
- Thomas Jefferson Award, University of Missouri System, 2024
- Finalist, Kirkus Prize for Nonfiction, for How Not to Kill Yourself, 2023
- Guggenheim Fellowship, 2011
- Finalist, National Magazine Award, 2008
- "Best Author of 2015" & "Best Author of 2009", The Kansas City Pitch.
- "Ten Best Books Ever Written on Failed Romance", The Guardian, 2016 "Best Books of 2015", Los Angeles Times For Bad Sex
- "Best Story", The Paris Review Daily 2012
- "Best Books of 2009" The Times Literary Supplement (chosen by Craig Raine), The Guardian (chosen by Jonathan Franzen), Publishers Weekly, The Kansas City Star, for How to Sell
- The Pushcart Prize, 2008
- UMKC Trustees’ Faculty Scholars Award, 2007
- Distinguished Teaching Award. Department of Philosophy. University of Texas at Austin, 2003
- Outstanding Teaching Award. Department of Philosophy. University of Texas at Austin, 2001, 2002
