= How Not to Kill Yourself =

2023 book by Clancy Martin

How Not to Kill Yourself: A Portrait of the Suicidal Mind
- Author: Clancy Martin
- Language: English
- Publisher: Pantheon Books
- Publication date: 2023
- Publication place: United States
- Pages: 464
- ISBN: 9780593317051
- Dewey Decimal: 362.28
- LC Class: HV6545 .M275 2023

How Not to Kill Yourself: A Portrait of the Suicidal Mind is a 2023 memoir by philosopher Clancy Martin, published by Pantheon Books, which is a subsidiary of Penguin Random House. The memoir documents Martin's struggles with depression and addiction as well as his rumination about suicide including his multiple suicide attempts throughout his life. The book was a finalist for the 2023 Kirkus Prize in non-fiction.

== Narrative ==
The memoir spans Martin's turbulent life from childhood to present day, detailing his struggles with alcoholism, depression and ten suicide attempts. Martin details his distressing childhood, including his parents' divorce when he was five years old, the death of his step-sibling who fell from a building and his father's own alcoholism and mental health struggles. This culminated in Martin's first attempted suicide, at six years old, when he rode his tricycle in front of a bus. Martin explores the possible motivations people may have with regards to attempting or committing suicide, drawing on analysis regarding the subject from philosophers such as Hume, Nietzsche, Albert Camus, and contemporary philosophers and authors as well as a variety of Buddhist thinkers. Martin compares suicidality to alcoholism or other addictions, arguing that thinking about suicide may be addictive in and of itself. Martin further explores his own reasons for attempting suicide and reconciles these with his new motivations to continue living. These include being there for his five children as well as the Buddhist principle of being present in the moment, without distressing about the past or the future. Martin also explains his belief to keep living, based in Stoicism, that "the door will always be open", or that you have the right to kill yourself but that right will always be there and, “you can always kill yourself tomorrow. Take a breath, get some space: tomorrow isn’t here yet. And maybe you’ll find you can get through today.”

In the last chapter, the book explains practical ways to avoid suicidal impulses or suicide attempts including partaking in regular exercise including walking outdoors, maintaining family connections, abstaining from alcohol and drugs. And the most important prevention to avoid suicide, as Martin suggests, is not to have a gun in the house. The appendix includes interviews with contemporary authors and thinkers, including Andrew Solomon about the subject of suicide and how to prevent it.

== Reception ==
Writing for the Los Angeles Review of Books, in a positive review, Gordon Marino states: "How Not to Kill Yourself is a riveting and inspiring read for anyone who has had to keep company with the chthonic feeling that the breath of life is a curse." Marino also said that Martin's background writing fiction allowed him to break down philosophical themes into easy to understand language. Writing for the New York Times, Alexandra Jacobs applauded Martin for providing sound advice on such a nebulous topic, stating: "I can see it [the book] becoming a rock for people who’ve been troubled by suicidal ideation, or have someone in their lives who is, and want to understand the mentality..." Writing for the Los Angeles Times, Robin Abcarian praised the book as a "deeply empathetic advice book for people considering suicide and those who love them." Writing for the Atlantic, writer David Ulin found that Martin had mishandled the material regarding suicide from authors Edouard Leve, David Foster Wallace and Nelly Arcan, stating that the material was "reverse engineered" to support Martin's own conclusions about suicide. However, Ulin describes Martin's descriptions of suicidality as a "cogent and (yes) rational an account of the mind existing in the shadow of its own self-destruction as I have read".
