= Carole Maso =

American novelist

- Maso in 2018 at the American Academy in Berlin.
- Born: March 9, 1955 (age 71); Paterson, New Jersey, U.S.
- Education: Vassar College (AB)
- Occupations: Novelist; Poet; Essayist
- Writing career
- Genres: fiction; poetry; memoir; essay; hybrid forms
- Notable awards: Lannan Literary Award for Fiction; National Endowment for the Arts Fellowship; American Academy in Berlin Fellow in Fiction
- Website: www.carolemaso.com

Carole Maso (born March 9, 1955) is an American novelist and essayist, known for her experimental, poetic and fragmentary narratives which are often called postmodern. She is the author of ten books, and is the recipient of numerous fellowships and awards, including the Lannan Literary Award for Fiction and the NEA Literature Fellowship in Creative Writing.

== Biography ==
Carole Maso was born in Paterson, New Jersey and received her A.B. in English from Vassar College in 1977. She has lived in Greenwich Village, Southern France, Provincetown, and the Hudson Valley, where she currently lives.

Since the publication of her first novel, Ghost Dance, in 1986, Maso has published 9 other works of fiction, poetry, essays, and prose. Her most recent work of fiction, Why So Soon Asleep? is forthcoming from Dalkey Archive Press in 2027. She is currently at work on two novels: Eternity and the Dreamer, and, her opus: The Bay of Angels. Maso has been writing The Bay of Angels over the course of the last 25 years. It is a "war inflected novel," which she considers "a meditation [...] 'on the profound mystery of suffering, the enigma of history, the power of invention, the properties of fever and light, and the beauty and resilience of the human psyche.'" Parts of the work have been featured in various journals and anthologies.

She is the recipient of numerous prizes and awards including the Rose Fellowship, a NEA fellowship, a Lannan Literary Fellowship for Fiction, and the Berlin Prize.

Maso has taught at a number of higher education institutions in the United States, including Illinois State University, George Washington University, Bennington College in the MFA Writing Program, Columbia University in the School of the Arts, and at the Brown University Literary Arts Program. She retired from Brown in 2022.

== Publications ==
=== Novels ===
- Ghost Dance. New York: Perennial Library, 1986, ISBN 0-88001-409-1
- The Art Lover. San Francisco: North Point Press, 1990, ISBN 0-8112-1629-2
- AVA. Normal, Illinois: Dalkey Archive Press, 1993, ISBN 1-56478-074-0
- The American Woman in the Chinese Hat. Normal, Illinois: Dalkey Archive Press, 1994, ISBN 1-56478-045-7
- Defiance. New York: Dutton, 1998, ISBN 0-452-27829-5
- Mother & Child. Berkeley, CA: Counterpoint Press, 2012, ISBN 978-1-58243-818-4

=== Poems in prose ===
- Aureole: An Erotic Sequence, Hopewell, New Jersey: Ecco, 1996 (Short fiction collection), ISBN 0872864103
- Beauty is Convulsive: The Passion of Frida Kahlo, 2002, ISBN 1-58243-089-6

=== Essays ===
- Break Every Rule: Essays on Language, Longing, and Moments of Desire. Washington, D.C.: Counterpoint, 2000, ISBN 1-58243-063-2

=== Memoir ===
- The Room Lit by Roses: A Journal of Pregnancy and Birth. Washington, D.C.: Counterpoint, 2002, ISBN 1-58243-212-0

== Awards ==
- 1977 — Vassar College WK Rose Fellowship
- 1988 — National Endowment for the Arts Literature Fellowship in Creative Writing
- 1993 — Lannan Literary Award for Fiction
- 2015 — American Academy in Rome Fellowship
- 2018 — American Academy in Berlin - Mary Ellen von der Heyden Fellow in Fiction

== See Also ==
- List of experimental women writers
