= Was This Man a Genius? =

Book by Julie Hecht

- Author: Julie Hecht
- Language: English
- Subject: Andy Kaufman
- Genre: Non-fiction
- Published: April 17, 2001
- Publisher: Random House
- Publication place: United States
- Media type: Print
- Pages: 192 pages
- ISBN: 0375504575
- Preceded by: Do the Windows Open?
- Followed by: The Unprofessionals

Was This Man a Genius?: Talks with Andy Kaufman is a 2001 non-fiction work by American author Julie Hecht. It was first published on April 17, 2001, through Random House and was republished in paperback through Simon & Schuster in 2009. The book is based on a book-length profile that Hecht had written, which was based on conversations that Hecht had held with comedian Andy Kaufman during 1978 and 1979.

== Synopsis ==
In 1978 Hecht was asked to interview Kaufman for a profile that was to be published in Harper's Magazine. For the following year she met several times with Kaufman, during which time he performed several pranks and acts in an attempt to unnerve Hecht. Despite this, Hecht continued in her attempts and was ultimately rewarded with a genuine interview, which she drafted into a profile that Harper's Magazine did not publish.

== Reception ==
Critical reception for Was This Man a Genius? was mixed. Publishers Weekly panned the work overall, stating "coming so far behind Zmuda's Andy Kaufman Revealed and Bill Zehme's Lost in the Funhouse, and containing little new information, the publication of this tedious biography seems almost as puzzling as the performer himself." Kirkus Reviews and the New York Times were more positive in their reviews, and the New York Times wrote that "in its relentlessly, unapologetically obsessive-compulsive author, Kaufman may have met his match."
