= Anthony Tognazzini =

American short story writer

- Born: 1969 (age 56–57); Orange, California, U.S.
- Education: University of California, Santa Cruz; Indiana University Bloomington
- Occupation: Short story writer

Anthony Tognazzini (born 1969) is an American short story writer.

== Biography ==
Anthony Tognazzini was born in 1969 in Orange, California. He is a Californio, descended from both the Pico family of California and the Carrillo family, which includes Mexican Governor of Alta California Carlos Antonio Carrillo and Governor Pío Pico. Tognazzini grew up in a military family in the Philippines, Spain, Texas, and California. He graduated from the University of California, Santa Cruz and Indiana University Bloomington, and has taught at New York University, the College of Wooster, and The New School.

He is the author of a collection of short fiction, I Carry A Hammer In My Pocket For Occasions Such As These, published in 2007 by BOA. A review of the collection in Bomb said, "Tognazzini deconstructs universal moments with language, revealing underlying beauty and bliss." His work has appeared in Electric Literature, TriQuarterly, Guernica, and Crazyhorse.

His short story "Neighbors," published by Electric Literature, was chosen for Selected Shorts and performed by actors Michael Imperioli and Cristin Milioti at Symphony Space in New York City in April 2017. The recording was distributed to radio stations through Public Radio International.

He lives in Ohio.

== Awards ==
- Ohio Arts Council - Individual Excellence Award
- Yaddo
- Djerassi Resident Artists Program
- Virginia Center for the Creative Arts Fellowship
- Millay Colony for the Arts Fellowship

== Published works ==
- I Carry A Hammer In My Pocket For Occasions Such As These (BOA 2007)
- "Thugs" in Guernica, Fall 2015
- "Neighbors"in Electric Literature, Summer 2015
- "Have You Heard Anything? in Guernica, Winter 2012
- "The Treehouse" in TriQuarterly, Summer 2012

== Anthologies ==
- James Thomas; Robert Scotellaro, eds. (2018). New Micro: Norton Anthology of Exceptionally Short Fiction. Norton. ISBN 978-0393354706.
- Sari Wilson; Josh Neufeld, eds. (2016). Flashed: Sudden Stories in Comics and Prose. Pressgang. ISBN 978-0990636427.
- Louis Armand, ed. (2010). The Return of Kral Majales (Prague's International Literary Renaissance 1990-2010). Univerzita Karlova. ISBN 978-8073083021.
- Peter Conners, ed. (2006). PP/FF: An Anthology. Starcherone Books. ISBN 978-0970316516.
- Dinty W. Moore, ed. (2003). Sudden Stories: The Mammoth Book of Miniscule Fiction. Mammoth Books. ISBN 978-0971805958.

== Interviews ==
- "There Is No Such Thing as Apolitical Writing: an Interview with Anthony Tognazzini" in Electric Literature, Summer 2015
- "2 + 2 can = Cake: A Conversation with Dean Young and Anthony Tognazzini" in Bomb, Fall 2012
