= Hesh Kestin =

American novelist

- Born: New York City, U.S.
- Occupations: Journalist; novelist
- Website: www.heshkestin.com

Hesh Kestin is an American journalist and novelist. Kestin describes his novels as "fiction hung upon a framework of the real".

== Childhood and education ==
Kestin was born in New York City. He immigrated to Israel in 1970, but spent time living in Europe as a foreign correspondent and by the 1990s was living in the United States.

== Career ==
Hesh has worked as a journalist for Newsday, Forbes, and the New York Herald Tribune. In the 1980s Kestin was a senior European correspondent for Forbes magazine, covering Africa and the Middle East as well as Europe. He escaped being of the victims of the 1985 Rome and Vienna airport attacks carried out by the Palestine Liberation Organization in which 19 passengers and were killed (along with 4 terrorists), because he had been out drinking the night before and had failed to wake up in time to get to the airport.

In 1988 Kestin was the creator and editor of a short-lived daily newspaper in Israel, The Nation, created as an English-language rival to the Jerusalem Post. The Nation was backed by investors in Los Angeles headed by David Wilstein. The paper folded after only 7 months.

From 1992 to 1994 Kestin, now living in Remsenburg, New York, handled public relations for the company Computer Associates in Islandia, New York.

In 1998 he became publisher and creator of a short-lived "Sunday paper" for Americans living abroad.

Kestin's first novel was The Iron Will of Shoeshine Cats, published by Dzanc Books. Writer Jonathan Evison calls Shoeshine Cats, a "criminally underappreciated" book, stating that it "left me breathless with its mastery of character and suspense."

== The Siege of Tel Aviv ==
Kestin's 2019 novel, The Siege of Tel Aviv was signed by Dzanc Books, publisher of earlier Kestin books, but just as the book was being released, the publisher announced that it would pulp all copies not yet shipped to booksellers due to accusations made that the pending book was Islamophobic. Individuals posting on social media in response to pre-publication publicity promotional copy that read, "While the U.S. and the West sit by, the Moslem armies – taking a page from the Nazi playbook – prepare to kill off the entire population," called the promotional statement inflammatory "othering" of Muslims.

The book is blurbed by Stephen King. The plot sets a replay of the 1973 Yom Kippur War in an unspecified future, with the wrinkle that this time Iran leads the invasion of Israel by the combined armies of neighboring Muslim states, and when the United States fails to come to Israel's aid, as it did in 1973, Israel's Jews are herded into a Third Reich-type ghetto in central Tel Aviv, where they wait to see whether they will be evacuated or annihilated. Critics of the book called this plot "Islamophobic". But Mark Horowitz, writing in Commentary, notes that the imagined destruction of Israel by Muslim armies is a popular fictional trope, citing Jonathan Safran Foer’s Here I Am (2016), and Michael Chabon's 2007 The Yiddish Policemen's Union in which Jewish refugees have settled in Alaska after Israel is overrun by Arab armies. Horowitz asserts that "The subversive joke of the novel is that it indulges Israel's enemies and take seriously their rhetoric of annihilation."

Dzanc's founding publisher, Steve Gillis, explained that, "It was never our intent to publish a novel that shows Muslims in a bad light... Our mistake was not gauging the climate and seeing how the book would be perceived in 2019."

Bookstores, including Amazon.com, continued to sell hardcover copies already in inventory, and Kestin has published the book himself in paperback and digital editions under the Shoeshine Press imprint.

== Books ==
=== Nonfiction ===
- 21st Century Management: The Revolutionary Strategies That Have Made Computer Associates a Multibillion-Dollar Software Giant, (1992, Atlantic Monthly Press), a profile of Computer Associates, the corporation for which Kestin would later work as a public relations specialist. Kestin wrote the book after becoming intrigued while covering the company for Forbes.

=== Fiction ===
- Based on a True Story (short story collection, 2008, Dzanc Books)
- The Iron Will of Shoeshine Cats (2009, Dzanc Books)
- The Lie (2015, Scribner)
- The Siege of Tel Aviv (2019)
