= All Souls (novel) =

2008 novel by Christine Schutt

- Author: Christine Schutt
- Publication date: 2008
- Publication place: United States

All Souls is a 2008 novel by American writer Christine Schutt. The book takes place in New York City, and follows the lives of faculty and students at the fictional Siddons School.

== Writing and composition ==
The novel draws from Schutt's experience as a teacher at an all-girls school in Manhattan. Since the book's publication, Schutt noted "types" from the school, Nightingale-Bamford, she would include if she were to rewrite it.

All Souls was in part inspired by David Malouf's novel Remembering Babylon. Despite perception that the novel "[pushes] the boundaries of fiction" Schutt has said she did not intend for it to do so.

== Plot ==
The novel follows Astra Dell and her classmates at Siddons School over the course of their senior year.

== Reception ==
=== Critical reception ===
Maud Casey, writing for the New York Times, referred to the novel as "refreshingly strange". Casey compared the novel favorably to the work of Virginia Woolf, whose novels Schutt references in All Souls. Publishers Weekly criticized Schutt for not "[doing] enough with the familiar prep school setting to make the story resonate".

In a review of Schutt's depiction of marriages, David Winters referred to the book's omniscient narrator as "[...] lending a sense of distance" to the novel, in contrast with her earlier Nightwork, which featured first person narration.

=== Honors ===
All Souls was nominated for the Pulitzer Prize for Fiction.
