= Will Schutt =

American poet (born 1981)

- Born: 1981 (age 44–45); New York City, U.S.
- Education: Oberlin College, Hollins University
- Occupations: Poet, translator
- Writing career
- Genre: Poetry
- Notable awards: Yale Series of Younger Poets, Amy Lowell Poetry Travelling Scholarship
- Website: www.wcschutt.com

Will Schutt (born 1981, New York City) is an American author. He wrote Westerly (Yale University Press, 2013), selected by Carl Phillips as the winner of the 2012 Yale Series of Younger Poets award.

== Life ==
Schutt is a graduate of Oberlin College and Hollins University, where he received his MFA. He is the recipient of fellowships from the James Merrill House, the Stadler Center for Poetry, the Reginald S. Tickner Writing Fellowship, the Jeannette Haien Ballard Prize and the Amy Lowell Poetry Travelling Scholarship. He was awarded fellowships to attend the Sewanee Writers' Conference and the Bread Loaf Writers' Conference.

In 2023, Princeton University Press published his translations of an Italian poet, Fabio Pusterla, in Brief Homage to Pluto and Other Poems. For his translations of Pusterla, Schutt received the Raiziss/de Palchi Translation Award and the Joseph Tusiani Italian Translation prize.

His poems and translations have appeared in Agni, Blackbird, FIELD, Narrative, The New Republic, The Southern Review, and Kenyon Review Online.

He is the son of American novelist Christine Schutt. He lives in Rome, Italy, and teaches at John Cabot University.

== Works ==
- Westerly, New Haven, Conn.: Yale University Press, 2013. ISBN 9780300188509, OCLC 930824020
- My Life I Lapped It Up: Selected Poems of Edoardo Sanguineti, Oberlin, OH.: Oberlin College Press, 2018. ISBN 9780997335545
- Brief Homage to Pluto and Other Poems by Fabio Pusterla, Princeton, NJ: Princeton University Press 2023. ISBN 9780691245096
