= Foamola =

New York City-based underground musical group

- Origin: New York City
- Genres: Folk music, folk pop, underground music
- Years active: 1991–present
- Members: Sparrow, Violet Snow, Lawrence Fishberg, Sylvia Gorelick

Foamola is an underground musical group from New York City, consisting of Sparrow and his wife, who went by the cyber alias Violet Snow. Also in the group is artist Lawrence Fishberg and Sparrow's daughter, poet Sylvia Gorelick. Their music has been described as "folk-minimalist", and as "anti-Plutarch pop". They attracted media attention for their performance at a 1995 party in honor of Phiber Optik in Manhattan. All Foamola songs to be found on BANDCAMP. lawrencefishberg.bandcamp.com

All songs written by Lawrence Fishberg, lyrics by Sparrow

== Discography ==
=== Albums ===
- May I Take a Bath? (self-released cassette, 1992)
- Spit on the Dishes (self-released cassette, 1993)

=== Individual songs ===
- "I've Been Reincarnated Too Many Times" and "John Quincy Adams" - appear on Poemfone: New Word Order (Tomato compilation, 1996)
