= The Ask =

2010 novel by Sam Lipsyte

First edition

The Ask is a novel by Sam Lipsyte, published by Macmillan in 2010 (ISBN 978-0-374-29891-3).

== Summary ==
Per Michael K. Walonen, the novel:

focuses on the American university, long seen as a bastion of resistance or at least indifference to the world of money, that has now become enmeshed in the world of finance. The Ask narrates the story of middle-aged schlemiel Milo Burke, a solicitor of donations in the development office of the third-rate college he dubs ‘the Mediocre University at New York City’. Early in the text, Milo is fired for impugning the artistic talent of a self-entitled daughter of a wealthy donor to the university, and for having been accused of sexual harassment by Horace, an ambitious young male office temp worker who later claims the complaint was meant in jest.

The bulk of the rest of the narrative focuses on Milo’s steady estrangement from his wife Maura and his attempt to get his job back through soliciting a large donation from Purdy, a wealthy former college friend who asks in return that Milo function as bagman go-between with the angry, estranged son he never knew he had, who has recently return from the Iraq War minus his legs.

== Reviews ==
- Geoff Dyer, 'The Ask by Sam Lipsyte', The Observer (6 June 2010).
