= Vi Khi Nao =

Cross-genre writer from Long Khánh, Vietnam

- Born: Long Khánh, Vietnam
- Education: Central College (BA); Brown University (MFA)
- Occupation: Writer
- Notable work: A Brief Alphabet of Torture (2017); The Old Philosopher (2016); Suicide: The Autoimmune Disorder of the Psyche (2023)

Vi Khi Nao is a cross-genre writer from Long Khánh, Vietnam. She is a graduate of Central College, where she studied Art and Spanish, and the MFA program at Brown University, where she received the John Hawkes Prize, the Feldman Prize and the Kim Ann Arstark Memorial Award. She was the 2022 recipient of Lambda Literary's Jim Duggins Outstanding Mid-Career Novelists' Prize.

She won FC2’s Ronald Sukenick Innovative Fiction Prize in 2016 for her short story collection, A Brief Alphabet of Torture.

Sheep Machine is an ekphrastic work written in response to Leslie Thornton's film of the same name. It was featured in The Paris Review as one of Sabrina Orah Mark's favorite books of 2019. It was also a Staff Pick at Small Press Distribution and Drawn & Quarterly. PEN America called it "a puzzle of a book that challenges the very way we read and consider words."

She has been a semi-regular contributor to the literary annual Noon since 2011.

Her 2023 book Suicide: The Autoimmune Disorder of the Psyche was shortlisted for the 2024 Lambda Literary Award for Lesbian Memoir or Biography.

== Bibliography ==
- The Italy Letters (Melville House, 2024)
- Suicide: The Autoimmune Disorder of the Psyche (11:11 Press, 2023)
- The Vegas Dilemma (11:11 Press, 2021)
- A Bell Curve Is a Pregnant Straight Line (11:11 Press, 2021)
- Human Tetris (with Ali Raz) (11:11 Press, 2019)
- Sheep Machine (Black Sun Lit, 2018)
- Umbilical Hospital (Press 1913, 2017)
- A Brief Alphabet of Torture (Fiction Collective Two 2016)
- Fish in Exile (Coffee House Press, 2016)
- The Old Philosopher (Nightboat Books, 2014)
- My Yellow Heart (Girl Noise Press, 2020)
