= Osama Alomar =

Syrian short story writer

Osama Alomar (Arabic: اسامة الحويج العمر; born 1968 in Damascus, Syria), is a Syrian short story writer, poet, and essayist. He is especially recognized for his work in the "very short story" medium. He has published three fiction collections in Arabic: أيها الانسان (O Man), ربطة لسان (Tongue Tie), and جميع الحقوق غير محفوظة (All Rights Not Reserved), as well as one volume of poetry, قال إنسان العصر الحديث (Man Said the Modern World). The 2007 winner of Egypt's Najlaa Muharam Short Story Contest, his work has been heard on the BBC Arabic Service and he is a regular contributor to various newspapers and journals in Syria and the Arab community, including Tishrin, an-Nur, Spot Light, al-Halil, Adab wa Naqd, and al-Ghad. His work has appeared in English translation in Noon (Literary Annual), Gigantic (magazine), Coffin Factory, and The Literary Review, as well as the online journals Conjunctions and The Outlet. Alomar is currently based in Chicago.

== Bibliography ==
=== Works in Arabic ===
- أيها الانسان (O Man). Beirut, 1999. Short Stories.
- قال إنسان العصر الحديث (Man Said the Modern World). Damascus, 2000. Poetry.
- ربطة لسان (Tongue Tie). Damascus, 2003. Short Stories and Meditations.
- جميع الحقوق غير محفوظة (All Rights Not Reserved), 2008. Short Stories.

=== Publications in English ===
- "Seven Very Short Stories" in Noon 2010.
- "Eleven Stories" in Web Conjunctions, May 3, 2011.
- "Two Stories by Osama Alomar" in The Outlet, March 18, 2011.
- "Breaking News" (10 stories) in "Coffin Factory" vol. 1, #2, February 2012.
- "Selections from All Rights Not Reserved, Tongue Tie, and O Man." in "The Literary Review" vol.55, no. 2 (Spring 2012).
- "Fullblood Arabian" translated by C. J. Collins with the author, a New Directions Poetry Pamphlet
- "Four Very Short Stories" in "Gigantic" issue 6, October 2014.
- The Teeth of the Comb and Other Stories translated by C. J. Collins with the author. New Directions, 2017.
