= Julie Hecht =

- Occupations: short story writer and novelist
- Writing career
- Period: 1989—
- Genre: fiction
- Notable works: Do the Windows Open? (1997); The Unprofessionals (2003)

Julie Hecht is a contemporary American fiction writer specializing in interlacing short stories.

== Personal life ==
Hecht has purposely revealed very little about her personal life. According to her publisher's website, she lives in the winter on the east end of Long Island, New York, and spends summer and fall in Massachusetts. In an interview with Publishers Weekly, Hecht said that the good reaction she got from her fellow schoolchildren gave her the idea to keep writing. "It's nice to look at a group of people and see them all smiling and laughing," she said. Hecht is somewhat reclusive about publicity, rarely giving interviews and avoiding the internet. She prefers to write by hand, sitting on a couch, and faxing her work back and forth to a typist for editing.

== Awards ==
- O. Henry Award for "I Want You, I Need You, I Love You" (1979, third prize)

== Bibliography ==
- Do the Windows Open? (1997)
- Was This Man a Genius?: Talks with Andy Kaufman (2001)
- The Unprofessionals: A Novel (2003)
- Happy Trails to You: Stories (2008)
