= Sparrow (American poet) =

American poet, activist, and musician (born 1953)

- Born: Michael Gorelick; October 2, 1953 (age 72)
- Occupations: Poet; activist; musician
- Spouse: Violet Snow
- Children: 1

Sparrow (born Michael Gorelick, October 2, 1953) is an American poet, activist, and musician.

As a member of the New York-based literary group The Unbearables, Sparrow has published several poetry collections with Soft Skull Press, as well as chapbooks in collaboration with the St. Mark's Poetry Project, and he has served as the editor for the literary journal Big Fish. He has been published in The New Yorker (after picketing their offices in 1996 while holding a sign reading, "My Poetry is as bad as yours)", The Quarterly, and The New York Times. He is the founder both of the "One Size Fits All Movement" and the East Village Militia. He was also featured in the PBS series The United States of Poetry, and his music (with the band Foamola) is featured on the poetry compilation Poemfone: New Word Order. He is also a gossip columnist for the Phoenicia Times, a contributing editor to Chronogram, and a substitute teacher.

He currently lives with his wife Violet Snow and daughter in the Woodstock region of the Catskill Mountains in New York.

== Works ==
- The Princeton Diary, Vinal Publishing, 2020, ISBN 978-1-7345036-0-9
- Republican Like Me: A Diary of My Presidential Campaign, Soft Skull Press, 2001, ISBN 978-1-887128-22-3
- Yes, you are a revolutionary! plus seven other books, Soft Skull Press, 2002, ISBN 1-887128-87-5
- America: A Prophecy : The Sparrow Reader, Soft Skull Press, 2005, ISBN 978-1-932360-86-8
- How to Survive the Coming Collapse of Civilization (And Other Helpful Hints), The Operating System, 2016, ISBN 978-0986050558
