= Rebecca Curtis =

American writer

- Born: January 10, 1974 (age 52)
- Education: Pomona College; Syracuse University (MFA); New York University
- Occupation: Writer
- Writing career
- Notable awards: Rona Jaffe Foundation Writers' Award (2005)

Rebecca Curtis (born January 10, 1974) is an American writer. She is the author of Twenty Grand and Other Tales of Love & Money (HarperCollins, 2007) and has been published in The New Yorker, Harper's, McSweeney's, NOON, N+1, and other magazines.

Curtis received her bachelor's degree from Pomona College in Claremont, California. She also holds an MFA from Syracuse University and a Master's in English from New York University. In 2005, she received a Rona Jaffe Foundation Writers Award for emerging female writers, and won the Rona Jaffe Foundation Writers' Award for fiction.

Curtis is a lecturer in Columbia University's Writing Program and is a contributor to Columbia: A Journal of Literature and Art.

== List of works ==
=== Books ===
- Twenty Grand (2007)
  - "Hungry Self" (originally published in The New Yorker, 2001)
  - "Summer, with Twins" (originally published in Harper's, 2005)
  - "To the Interstate" (originally published in Conjunctions, 2005)
  - "The Alpine Slide" (originally published in The New Yorker, 2004)
  - "The Near-Son" (originally published in n+1, 2007)
  - "Big Bear, California" (originally published in Harper's, 2002)
  - "Monsters" (originally published in Crowd)
  - "Knick, Knack, Paddywhack" (originally published in Fence)
  - "Twenty Grand" (originally published in The New Yorker, 2005)
  - "The Wolf at the Door" (originally published in StoryQuarterly, 2004)
  - "Solicitation" (originally published in McSweeney's)
  - "The Witches"
  - "The Sno-Kone Cart" (originally published in McSweeney's, 2005)

=== Uncollected stories ===
- "The Deep Red Cremation of Isaac and Grace" (The Antioch Review, 2002)
- "Someone Like Sue" (NOON, 2006)
- "The Contradiction" (Columbia, 2007)
- "The White Fox" (Columbia, 2007)
- "My Race Speech" (Esquire, 2008)
- "The Gusher" (McSweeney's, 2013)
- "Fish Rot" (n+1, 2013)
- "The Christmas Miracle" (The New Yorker, 2013)
- "The Toast" (Harper's, 2014)
- "The Pink House" (The New Yorker, 2014)
- "The Magic Thyroid and Energy Boosting Chocolate Truffles" (n+1, 2014)
- "Waterloo!" (McSweeney's, 2014)
- "Hansa and Gretyl and Piece of Shit" (The New Yorker, 2020)
- "Satellites" (The New Yorker, 2021)
