= Bon Voyage =

Bon Voyage may refer to:

- Bon voyage, a French phrase borrowed into English, usually translated as "have a nice trip".

== Film and television ==
- Bon Voyage (1933 film), a German musical film directed by Alfred Abel
- Bon Voyage (1944 film), a short propaganda film by Alfred Hitchcock
- Bon Voyage (1954 film), a West German musical film
- "Bon Voyage", a 1956 episode of I Love Lucy
- Bon Voyage, a 1958 Filipino film starring Fernando Poe Jr.
- Bon Voyage! (1962 film), a Disney family film and comic book
- Bon Voyage (2003 film), a World War II drama
- Bon Voyage (2016 film), a Swiss-German short film
- Bon Voyage, Charlie Brown (and Don't Come Back!!), a 1980 animated film
- "Bon Voyage" (Gilmore Girls), the finale episode of the TV series Gilmore Girls
- Bon Voyage, 2016–2019 variety show by boy-band BTS

== Music ==
- Bon Voyage!, composition by Charles Harford Lloyd (1849–1919)
- Bon Voyage (band), a musical group

=== Albums ===
- Bon Voyage (Anna Rossinelli album), 2011
- Bon Voyage (McCoy Tyner album), 1987
- Bon Voyage (Koda Kumi album), 2014
- Bon Voyage (Melody's Echo Chamber album), 2018

=== Songs ===
- "Bon Voyage", song by Henri Salvador, recorded by
  - Jocelyne Jocya (1942–2003), 1958
  - Gloria Lasso (1922–2005), 1959
- "Bon Voyage" (The Little Heroes song), 1983
- "Bon Voyage" (Deichkind song), 2000
- "Bon Voyage", a song by Allie X from the deluxe edition to her 2024 album Girl with No Face
- "Bon Voyage", a song by Bon-Bon Blanco, the theme song for the anime series One Piece, 2004
- "Bon Voyage", a song from the musical The Devil Wears Prada
- "Bon Voyage", a song from the Netflix show "Lost in Starlight" released in 2025

== Other uses ==
- Bon Voyage! (shop), a Disney goods specialty shop in Japan
- The Sims 2: Bon Voyage, a 2007 expansion pack for the computer game The Sims 2

== See also ==
- Bomb Voyage, a character in the film The Incredibles
