= Do the Windows Open? =

- First edition
- Author: Julie Hecht
- Language: English
- Genre: Fiction
- Published: January 21, 1997
- Publisher: Random House
- Publication place: United States
- Media type: Print
- ISBN: 067945201X
- Followed by: Was This Man a Genius?

Do the Windows Open? is a 1997 short story collection and the first published book by American author Julie Hecht. The book was first published in hardback on January 21, 1997 through Random House and a paperback version was released the following year by Penguin Books.

== Synopsis ==
The collection comprises nine short stories, each of which are narrated by Isabelle, a freelance photographer. The stories collected are listed as follows:

1. "Perfect Vision"
2. "Do the Windows Open?"
3. "A Lovely Day"
4. "That's No Fun"
5. "Were the Ornaments Lovely?"
6. "The Thrill Is Gone"
7. "I Couldn't See a Thing"
8. "The World of Ideas"
9. "Who Knows Why"

== Reception ==
Critical reception for Do the Windows Open has been predominantly positive. The New York Times reviewer Elizabeth Frank wrote that the collection's narrator was "complex, trying, engaging and lovable. Like the Ancient Mariner, she takes hold and won't let go, and by the time you finish the book you are hers forever. What finally comes through is the exhausting pains she takes to restore life to itself, and herself to life." The Chicago Tribune also praised the work, stating "Like the narrator's lashes, Hecht's language appears to have been gone over with a tiny steel comb again and again until it is picked free of any glop. The result is a treasure, a book as dense and perfect as a chocolate flourless torte."
