= Amie Barrodale =

American fiction writer

- Education: University of Iowa
- Occupations: Writer, editor
- Writing career
- Genre: Fiction
- Notable works: You Are Having a Good Time, Trip

Amie Barrodale is an American writer and former fiction editor of Vice. She is the author of the short story collection You Are Having a Good Time. Her novel Trip was a New Yorker Essential Read, a New York Times Notable Book, long listed for the PEN Faulkner Award.

== Education ==
Barrodale attended the Iowa Writers' Workshop.

== Short stories ==
Barrodale's short story "William Wei" won The Paris Review's Plimpton Prize in 2012. The same periodical published her "Protectors" in 2016, and "Crystal Palace" in 2025. The latter is a satire on the presumed drinking and sexual habits of Clarence Thomas and Brett Kavanaugh, both US Supreme Court judges.

=== You Are Having a Good Time ===
Her debut short story collection, You Are Having a Good Time, was published by Farrar, Straus and Giroux in 2016. Her debut novel Trip was published by FSG in September of 2025.

The New York Times wrote: "All of the stories in this stark and cutting collection grapple with our failure to communicate, and investigate not merely the woeful inefficiency of language itself (although that's bad enough) but also the inherent impossibility of truly understanding another person's internal state. Barrodale has captured something near to what it feels like to be confined to a human brain." Bookforum called it an "icy, masterful first short-story collection," praising how "Barrodale elevates anecdotes into art."

Carmen Maria Machado, writing for NPR, noted that the stories' conflicts are nothing new, but that "the old struggle is freshened by these characters' voices, and how they justify the low-grade, unyielding stubbornness of their desire to do what they are doing, consequences and reality be damned."

== Works ==
- Barrodale, Amie (2016). You are having a good time: stories. New York: Farrar, Straus and Giroux. ISBN 978-0-374-29386-4.
- Barrodale, Amie (2025). Trip. New York: Farrar, Straus and Giroux. ISBN 978-0-374-61734-9.
