= Happy Trails to You: Stories =

- First edition
- Author: Julie Hecht
- Language: English
- Genre: Fiction, short story
- Published: May 6, 2008
- Publisher: Simon & Schuster
- Publication place: United States
- Media type: Print, e-book
- Pages: 224 pages
- ISBN: 141656425X
- Preceded by: The Unprofessionals

Happy Trails to You: Stories is a 2008 collection of short stories by American author Julie Hecht. It was first published on May 6, 2008, through Simon & Schuster and was reprinted in paperback by the publisher the following year. Like her prior two fictional works, the collection's stories follow Isabelle, a middle aged photographer.

== Synopsis ==
The collection comprises seven short stories, listed as follows:

1. "Over There"
2. "Being and Nothingness"
3. "A Little Present on This Dark November Day"
4. "Thank You for the Mittens"
5. "Get Money"
6. "Cramp Bark"
7. "Happy Trails to You"

== Reception ==
Critical reception for Happy Trails to You: Stories has been positive. The Plain Dealer and Boston.com both gave favorable reviews of the work, and Boston.com wrote that "Like the photographs the narrator captures in this new collection, she too comes into greater focus, as Hecht reveals, with a careful, confident hand, a woman who is many things: fraught and frustrating, hilarious and hopeless, but ultimately, just an individual trying to survive in the world." Entertainment Weekly was somewhat mixed in their review, stating "Julie Hecht can be droll, but her narrator’s relentless neuroses ultimately grate."
