= David Galef =

American writer

- Born: David Adam Galef; March 27, 1959 (age 67); New York City, U.S.
- Education: Princeton University; Columbia University (MA, PhD)
- Occupations: Writer; critic; poet; translator; essayist
- Writing career
- Genre: Fiction

David Adam Galef (born March 27, 1959) is an American fiction writer, critic, poet, translator, and essayist.

Born in the Bronx, he grew up in Scarsdale. He graduated summa cum laude from Princeton University in 1981, after which he lived in Osaka, Japan, for a year. He received an M.A. in English from Columbia University in 1984, and a Ph.D. in literature in 1989. In 1992, he married Beth Weinhouse, and in 1995, their son, the poet Daniel Galef, was born. From 1989 to 2008, he was a professor of English at the University of Mississippi in Oxford, where he administered the M.F.A. program in creative writing until 2007. David Galef and his family currently live in Montclair, where he is an English professor and director of the creative writing program at Montclair State University.

Galef has published twenty books. In addition, he has written over two hundred short stories for magazines ranging from the British Punch to the Czech Prague Revue, the Canadian Prism International and the American Shenandoah. His essays and reviews have appeared in The New York Times, Newsday, The Village Voice, Twentieth Century Literature, The Columbia History of the British Novel and many other places. His awards include a Henfield Foundation grant, a Writers Exchange award from Poets & Writers, the Meringoff Prize for fiction, and a Mississippi Arts Council grant, as well as residencies at Yaddo, Ragdale, Virginia Center for the Creative Arts, and Millay Arts.

== Works ==
Novels

- Flesh. The Permanent Press, 1995. Russian translation, 2008.
- Turning Japanese. The Permanent Press, 1998.
- How to Cope with Suburban Stress. The Permanent Press, 2006. Russian translation rights and film option sold, 2007.
- Where I Went Wrong. Regal House Publishing, 2025.

Short-Story Collections

- Laugh Track. The University Press of Mississippi, 2002.
- A Man of Ideas and Other Stories. Noemi Press, 2008.
- My Date with Neanderthal Woman. Dzanc Books, 2011.

Poetry Collections

- Flaws. David Roberts Books, 2007.
- Lists. D-N Publishing, 2007.
- Apocalypses. Finishing Line Press, 2009.
- Kanji Poems. Word Poetry, 2015.

Children's Books

- The Little Red Bicycle. Illus. Carol Nicklaus. Random House, 1988.
- Tracks. Illus. Tedd Arnold. William Morrow, 1996. Rpt.by Junior Library Guild, 1996, and Scholastic (paperback and audio tape), 1996.

Translations

- Even Monkeys Fall from Trees: The Wit and Wisdom of Japanese Proverbs. Illus. Jun Hashimoto. Tuttle, 2000. Rpt. of Even Monkeys Fall from Trees, and Other Japanese Proverbs. 1987.
- Even a Stone Buddha Can Talk: More Wit and Wisdom of Japanese Proverbs. Illus. Jun Hashimoto. Tuttle, 2000.
- Japanese Proverbs: Wit and Wisdom. Illus. Jun Hashimoto. Tuttle, 2012.

Criticism

- Second Thoughts: A Focus on Rereading. Wayne State University Press, 1998. [Editor and contributor.]
- The Supporting Cast: A Study of Flat and Minor Characters. The Pennsylvania State University Press, 1993.

Anthology

- 20 over 40. The University Press of Mississippi, 2006. [Co-editor with Beth Weinhouse.]

Textbook

- Brevity: A Flash Fiction Handbook. Columbia University Press, 2016.

Edition

- Tess of the d’Urbervilles, by Thomas Hardy. Barnes & Noble, 2005. [Editor.]

== See also ==
- Tedd Arnold

== External references ==
- Contemporary Authors. Vol. 145. Ed. Kathleen J. Edgar. Gale Research, 1995. 151.
- World Authors 1990–1995, ed. Clifford Thompson (H. W. Wilson, 1999). 241–43.
- Mississippi Writers Page, https://web.archive.org/web/20080204205546/http://www.olemiss.edu/mwp/dir/galef_david/index.html
- Interview with David Galef
