= Susan Daitch =

American novelist

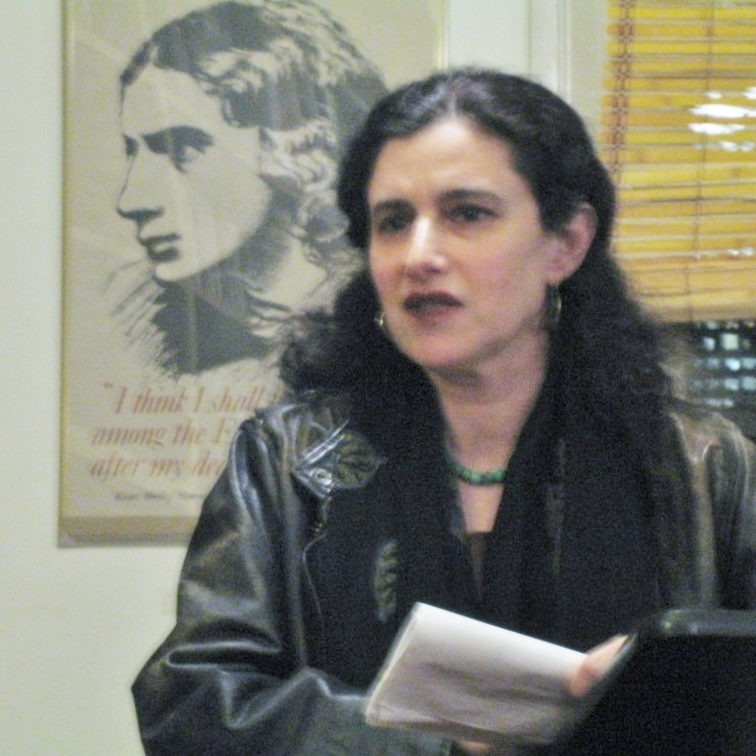
- Daitch in 2007
- Education: Barnard College
- Writing career
- Genres: Short Story, Novel, Essays

Susan Daitch is an American novelist, essayist, and short story writer. In 1996 David Foster Wallace called her "one of the most intelligent and attentive writers at work in the U.S. today."

== Early life and education ==
Susan Daitch was born in New Haven, Connecticut. She graduated from Barnard College and attended the Whitney Museum Independent Study Program.

== Career ==
She is the author of seven novels and a collection of short stories.

Her work has appeared in Guernica, Bomb, Pacific Review, The Barcelona Review, Fault Magazine, Rain Taxi, Tablet, Tin House, McSweeney's, Conjunctions, The Norton Anthology of Postmodern American Fiction, and elsewhere.

Her novel Siege of Comedians was listed as one of the best books of 2021 in The Wall Street Journal.

She taught at Barnard College, Columbia University, and the Iowa Writers' Workshop.

A 2012 New York Foundation for the Arts Fellow, she is a supporter of Women for Afghan Women.

== Bibliography ==
- L.C. Harcourt Brace Jovanovich, 1987; Dalkey Archive Press, 2002
- The Colorist. Vintage Contemporaries, 1990
- Storytown: Stories. Dalkey Archive Press, 1996
- Paper Conspiracies. City Lights Books, 2011
- Fall Out. Madras Press, 2013
- The Lost Civilization of Suolucidir. City Lights Books, 2016
- White Lead: A Novel of Suspense. Alibi, 2016 (e-book)
- Siege of Comedians. Dzanc Books, 2021
- The Adjudicator. Green City Books, 2025
