= Christine Schutt =

American novelist and writer

- Education: University of Wisconsin, Madison (BA, MA); Columbia University (MFA)
- Occupations: Novelist; short story writer
- Children: 2
- Website: www.christineschutt.com

Christine Schutt (born May 3, 1948) is an American novelist and short story writer, has been a finalist for the National Book Award for Fiction and the Pulitzer Prize for Fiction. She received her BA and MA from the University of Wisconsin–Madison and her MFA from Columbia University. She is also a senior editor at NOON, the literary annual published by Diane Williams.

== Publications ==
Schutt is the author of three collections of short stories: Nightwork; A Day, a Night, Another Day, Summer; and Pure Hollywood. Nightwork was chosen by poet John Ashbery as the best book of 1996 for The Times Literary Supplement. Her novel Florida was a finalist for the 2004 National Book Award for Fiction and her second novel, All Souls, was published by Harcourt in spring of 2008 and was a finalist for the 2009 Pulitzer Prize in fiction. Her most recent novel, Prosperous Friends, was published by Grove Press in November 2012. She has twice won an O. Henry Award, as well as a Pushcart Prize, and is the recipient of fellowships from the New York Foundation of the Arts and Guggenheim Foundation. Pure Hollywood: And Other Stories was published by Grove Press (US) in March 2018 and And Other Stories (UK) in May 2018.

== Personal ==
She lives in New York City and has two sons, Nick and Will. Will Schutt, author of Westerly, was the 2012 recipient of the Yale Prize for Younger Poets.

== Other work ==
From 1984 to 2014, Schutt taught English and creative writing at the Nightingale-Bamford School, where she served as the faculty adviser for the school literary magazine Philomel. She has taught and continues to teach graduate and undergraduate writing at Barnard College, Bennington College, Columbia University, Hollins University, Sarah Lawrence College, the University of Massachusetts Amherst, Syracuse University and UC Irvine. She has taught at the Sewanee Writers' Conference in the years 2006, 2008, 2010, 2011, 2012, 2013, 2014, and 2017.

== Published work ==
=== Novels ===
- Florida (TriQuarterly, 2004)
- All Souls (Houghton Mifflin Harcourt, 2008)
- Prosperous Friends (Grove, 2012)

=== Short story collections ===
- Nightwork (Knopf, 1996)
- A Day, a Night, Another Day, Summer (TriQuarterly, 2005)
- Pure Hollywood (Grove, 2018)
