= Dzanc Books =

US publisher

- Founded: 2006
- Founder: Steven Gillis and Dan Wickett
- Country of origin: United States
- Headquarters location: Ann Arbor, Michigan
- Distribution: Publishers Group West
- Publication types: Books
- Fiction genres: Literary fiction
- Official website: www.dzancbooks.org

Dzanc Books is an American independent press book publisher. It is a non-profit 501(c)(3) private foundation. Michelle Dotter is publisher and editor-in-chief.

== Background ==
Dzanc Books was founded in 2006 by Steven Gillis, a lawyer turned novelist, and Dan Wickett, a prolific on-line book reviewer. They operated from their homes, near Detroit, Michigan.

== Mission ==
Dzanc pursues literary fiction and eBooks. They published their own list of independent 20 writers to watch in response to The New Yorker's list of "20 Under 40", which they felt was too establishment-oriented.

== Former staff ==
Former staff includes author Matt Bell as senior editor.

== Authors ==
Published authors include Roy Kesey, Yannick Murphy, Terese Svoboda, Allison Amend, Jeff Parker, Peter Selgin, Laura van den Berg, Anne Valente, Robert Coover, Lance Olsen, Joseph McElroy, Robert Lopez, Evan Lavender-Smith, Jen Michalski, Dawn Raffel, J. Robert Lennon, Adam Klein, Okey Ndibe, Mary Biddinger, Charles Blackstone, David Galef, Aimee Parkison, Kyle Minor, Kelly Cherry.

== Name ==
The name "Dzanc" was formed from the initials of the names of the founders' five children. It is pronounced as two syllables, "duh-ZAANCK" or "da-zaynk".

== Publication cancellation ==
Dzanc cancelled publication of Hesh Kestin's 2019 novel The Siege of Tel Aviv following criticism on social media that termed the book "Islamophobic." Publisher Steve Gillis explained that "It was never our intent to publish a novel that shows Muslims in a bad light... Our mistake was not gauging the climate and seeing how the book would be perceived in 2019."

== Imprints ==
As a non-profit, Dzanc cannot "own" another company, so these are not "imprints" in the usual publishing business sense.

- Other Voices, Inc. (OV Books and Other Voices, a literary journal)
- Keyhole Press
- Istros Books
- DISQUIET
- Monkeybicycle, a literary journal
- The Collagist, a literary journal
- Hawthorne Books

== Accolades ==
Dzanc Books has been called "the future of publishing" and "one of the great contemporary forces in independent publishing".
