= Mahvish Rukhsana Khan =

American lawyer (born 1978)

- Born: July 8, 1978 (age 48); Michigan, U.S.
- Education: University of Michigan (BA); University of Miami School of Law (JD)
- Occupations: Lawyer, writer

Mahvish Rukhsana Khan (born July 8, 1978) is a Pashtun-American lawyer and writer.

She graduated from the University of Michigan with a Bachelor of Arts in Political Science and Government and from the University of Miami School of Law with a Juris Doctor.

While still in University of Miami School of Law, Khan, who speaks Pashto, and whose parents are Pashtun, worked as an interpreter for defense attorneys representing detainees held at Guantanamo Bay detention camp. After visiting the military base, she wrote of her experiences in The Washington Post in 2006. That article was later expanded into a book, My Guantanamo Diary: The Detainees and the Stories They Told me, published in 2008 by PublicAffairs.

On February 25, 2010, Daily Times, a Pakistani newspaper, published an excerpt from her book, where she describes meeting Ali Shah Mousovi – the first captive she met. She reported that Mousavi told her of having faced serious abuse, including a week of confinement in a coffin-sized box, beatings, stress positions, and being soaked with freezing cold water.

Khan is now providing supervised legal counsel for one Afghan detainee at Guantanamo.
