= Leni Zumas =

American novelist

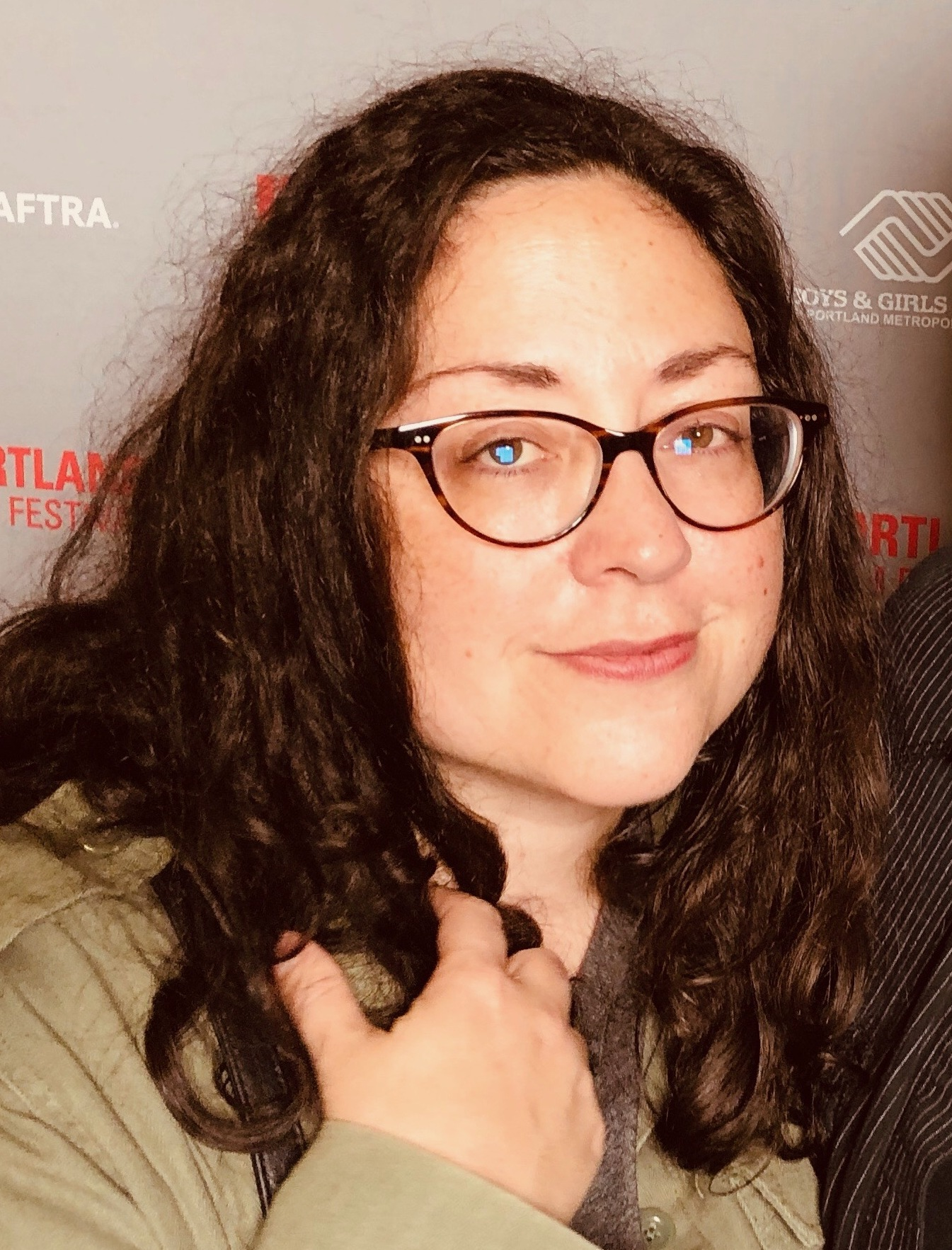
Leni Zumas (2018)

Leni Zumas is an American writer from Washington, D.C., who lives in Oregon. She is the author of Wolf Bells, Red Clocks, The Listeners, and the story collection Farewell Navigator. Her short fiction, essays, and interviews have appeared in BOMB, The Cut, Granta, Guernica, Portland Monthly, The Times Literary Supplement, The Sunday Times Style (UK), Tin House, and elsewhere. She teaches creative writing at Portland State University.

== Career ==
Zumas majored in English at Brown University and earned an MFA in Creative Writing from the University of Massachusetts Amherst. Before joining the English faculty at Portland State University, she taught writing at Columbia University, Hunter College, Eugene Lang College, the University of Massachusetts Amherst, and the Juniper Summer Writing Institute.

Her second novel, Red Clocks (Little, Brown, 2018), was a national bestseller and winner of the Oregon Book Award in Fiction. It was shortlisted for the Orwell Prize for Political Fiction and the Neukom Institute Literary Arts Award for Speculative Fiction. Naomi Alderman's review in The New York Times calls the novel "a lyrical and beautifully observed reflection on women's lives"; Ploughshares describes it as "a reckoning, a warning, and nothing short of a miracle"; and Maggie Nelson has said, "Red Clocks is funny, mordant, baroque, political, poetic, alarming, and inspiring—not to mention a way forward for fiction now." Cleveland Review of Books said that the questions the book poses are the questions that Americans are asking today, as we look to a future where Roe v. Wade could be overturned.

Red Clocks was a New York Times Book Review Editors' Choice, an Amazon Best Book of the Month, and an IndieBound Indie Next pick. It was named a Best Book of 2018 by The Atlantic, HuffPost, Entropy, and the New York Public Library. The Washington Post named it a notable book of 2018. Vulture voted it one of the 100 Most Important Books of the 21st Century So Far. Red Clocks was published in the UK by The Borough Press/HarperCollins and has been translated into eight languages.

Zumas's first novel, The Listeners (Tin House, 2012), was a finalist for the Oregon Book Award and was selected by Powell's Books for its Indiespensable First Edition Club.

Farewell Navigator: Stories was published in 2008 by Open City. "If darkness has ever been your friend, your story is in here," said Miranda July of the collection. A review in L.A. Weekly observed: "It's a rare writer who can bring us closer to people we might cross the street to avoid."

Her third novel, Wolf Bells, was published by Algonquin Books on September 16, 2025. The novel explores themes of communal living, caregiving, and America's crisis of care through the story of an intergenerational household run by a former punk singer. It was named a Most Anticipated Book of 2025 by LitHub, Ms. Magazine, Alta, and InsideHook.

== Publications ==
=== Books ===
- Farewell Navigator. Open City, 2008. ISBN 9781890447496
- The Listeners. Tin House, 2012. ISBN 9781935639299
- Red Clocks. Little, Brown, 2018. ISBN 9781478944072
- Wolf Bells. Algonquin, 2025. ISBN 9781643756578

=== Recent short works ===
- "Navigable Waters." Greenpeace.org.
- "Letters to Mothers: Crones, Hags, Witches, and Killjoys." with Sophia Shalmiyev, Guernica, 2019.
- "That." Granta, 2018.
- "The Moraine." Portland Monthly, 2018.
- "She Was Warned." Tin House, 2017.
- "Voss, Bree, Fend, Light." The Elephants, 2017.
