= Joe Wenderoth =

American poet

Joe Wenderoth is an American poet. He has published seven books: five books of poetry, an epistolary novel, and a book of essays. His work has been published in Harpers, The Nation, The Anchor Book of New American Short Stories, Best American Poetry 2007, Best American Essays 2008, Poetry 180, The Next American Essay, The Best American Poems: From Poe to Present, The Body Electric, The New American Poets: A Bread Loaf Anthology, and American Poetry: Next Generation.

== Background and early life ==
Joe Wenderoth was born on June 29, 1966, in Baltimore, MD to his father Joe, Sr. and mother Kathryn Wenderoth. His father was a systems analyst and his mother was a nurse. He attended Loyola University Maryland, to obtain his Bachelor's degree in 1988. At New York University, he participated in a graduate study before deciding to earn his M.F.A. at Warren Wilson College in 1993.

=== Career ===
He worked as an instructor in Creative Writing at New York University from 1990–91; an instructor in English at Harford Community College in 1993; an instructor in English at Catonsville Community College, from 1993–94; an instructor in English at Baltimore International Culinary College, Baltimore, MD, in 1995; Instructor at Center for Talented Youth at Johns Hopkins University, Baltimore, MD, from 1994-1995; and currently teaches in the creative writing graduate program at University of California, Davis. He also worked as a van driver and delivery person.

== Themes and style ==
Bomb magazine characterizes his work as "uncomfortable honesty”, describing his poems as “bleak but always full-bodied in the experiences they channel.” Wenderoth's poetry aligns with themes of absurdity, vulgarity, and satire. His work has been called gritty, irreverent and witty by Publishers Weekly, often aided by his use of prose. He often utilizes these themes to discuss heavy topics of societal issues, faults within capitalist America and bureaucracy, and mental illness.

Wenderoth's work has also been defined as seriocomic, which the Oxford dictionary defines “as combining the serious and the comic; serious in intention but jocular in manner, or vice versa.” He also consistently employs the theme of gallows humor throughout his work as he consistently utilizes humor in order to make fun of grim, disastrous, and terrifying situation. His work within the Inscription of the Seizure State is also credited at GIGANTIC magazine for “creating a new culture-agon that aims to unmire itself of poetry and convey how the poetic manifests itself in the SEIZURE of ourselves.” He often comments on the human experience, utilizing compressed vignettes about seemingly minor or preposterous issues that reveal desperate humanity. The Boston Review comments on his writing style, that it champions ridiculous possibilities of change that deride the United States culpabilities and hypocrisies In a review of Wenderoth’s poetry, poet Calvin Bedient commented that it "makes quick cuts in the meat of the ordinary, which is the meat of the impossible."

== Bibliography ==
In addition to his written works, Wenderoth curates "The Seizure State” (sometimes referred to as Inscription of the Seizure State) as editor for the Brooklyn-based magazine GIGANTIC, and produces the podcast About Brett Favre, which is associated with The Seizure State. The podcast is accessible via Internet Archive and is described via its description as “concerning things indescribable. Brett Favre is one such thing. Buck Hunter is another. Really the indescribable things are all around. Yes and no at the same time. All contradictions existing at the same time. Disaster. Sympathy.” Wenderoth commented on the podcast when asked about it by BOMB magazine and replied “I have all this good stuff on audio (referring to his recordings of environs) and it seems like doing a podcast (on the low-fi) is something like making a mix tape. I thought: What would it be like if a podcast was not afraid to take that next step? What would it be like if a podcast dared to show everything? Brett Favre is the central figure in the post-mortem age, and our society’s refusal to come to grips with this fact is no doubt the fault of the sort of people who refuse to even listen. Isn’t it about time someone took action?”

=== Articles ===
PloughShares, Spring 2001 Edition-Poet of The Accomplishment and At the Races

=== Novels ===
Letters to Wendy’s (Verse Press, 2000):

In 2007, Wenderoth performed in collaboration with Gibby Haynes (of the Butthole Surfers) in Brooklyn at the Issue Project Room.

=== Poetry ===
If I Don’t Breathe How Do I Sleep (Wave Books, 2014):

No Real Light (Wave Books, 2007).

It Is If I Speak (Wesleyan University Press, 2000)

The Endearment (Short Line Editions, 1999)

Disfortune (Wesleyan University Press, 1995)

=== Essays ===
The Holy Spirit of Life: Essays Written for John Ashcroft’s Secret Self
