= Robert Lopez (writer) =

American writer

Robert Lopez (born 1971) is an American writer of novels and short stories, who lives in Brooklyn, New York. His fiction has appeared in many journals, including Bomb, The Threepenny Review, Vice Magazine, New England Review, New Orleans Review, American Reader, Brooklyn Rail, Hobart, Indiana Review, Literarian, Nerve, New York Tyrant, and Norton Anthology of International Flash Fiction. He teaches at The New School, Pratt Institute, Columbia University, and Pine Manor College. He was co-editor of avant-literary magazine Sleepingfish. In 2010, he was awarded a Fellow in Fiction from the New York Foundation for the Arts, which included a grant for a three-year period.

He started a blog to have a single site for information about his work but was averse to frequent blog posts. He was posting daily No News Today, but then decided to invite friends and colleagues to post. It has since been replaced with www.robertlopez.net

== Approach to writing ==
In an interview with author Peter Markus Lopez said of his writing,

I don’t think about the reader at all when I work. Indeed, the only reader I’m concerned with is myself. I suppose if I can entertain myself, then there might be a few others out there in the world who might be likewise entertained. I would like to find more of those readers, certainly. Some readers find these stories dark and depressing, but that is not how I find them at all. Almost all of the stories make me laugh. As a reader, I want to be entertained, and I want to be compelled. I want to get the wind knocked out of me. This impact can only happen through language. I don’t care about the story, the goings-on: only how they are told.

== Publications ==
=== Novels ===
- Part of the World (2007) Calamari Press, ISBN 978-0977072385
- Kamby Bolongo Mean River (2009) Dzanc Books, ISBN 978-0976717768
- All Back Full (2017) Dzanc Books, ISBN 978-1-941088-67-8

=== Short stories ===
- Asunder (2010) Dzanc Books, ISBN 978-0982631812
- Good People (2016) Bellevue Literary Press, ISBN 978-1942658023
