= Deb Olin Unferth =

American writer (born 1968)

- Unferth at the 2026 Texas Book Festival
- Born: November 19, 1968 (age 58)
- Writing career
- Notable works: Revolution and Barn 8

Deb Olin Unferth (born November 19, 1968) is an American author. She has published two novels, two books of short stories, a memoir, and a graphic novel. Her fiction and essays have appeared in over fifty magazines and journals, including Harper's, The New York Times, The Paris Review The Believer, McSweeney's, Granta The Guardian, and NOON. She was a finalist for the National Book Critics' Circle Award, and she has received a Guggenheim fellowship, four Pushcart Prizes, a Creative Capital Fellowship for Innovative Literature, and residency fellowships from the MacDowell and Yaddo Foundations.

== Early life and education ==
She grew up in Chicago. She has an MFA from Syracuse University, where she studied with George Saunders, Tobias Wolff, and Michael Martone.

In 1987, as a freshman in college studying liberation theology, she dropped out of school and traveled through Central America interviewing and writing about key political and religious figures involved in the civil wars in Guatemala and El Salvador, the Sandinista revolutionary government in Nicaragua, and the Noriega dictatorship in Panama. These travels formed the basis of her memoir Revolution: The Year I Fell in Love and Went to Join the War, published by Holt in 2011, which was a finalist for a 2012 National Book Critics Circle Award.

She became a vegan in 2008. In 2020 she published the novel Barn 8, which is about the personhood of chickens and industrial egg farming. For the book, she did extensive research, which appears in a longform article in Harper's Magazine. The New York Times called Barn 8, "a beautiful, urgent, politically charged book.'"'

She is married to the philosophy professor Matt Evans, who specializes in ancient Greek philosophy.

== Career ==
Unferth's first book of stories, Minor Robberies, appeared in a box with two other books of stories, by Dave Eggers and Sarah Manguso. The box of books was published by McSweeney's.

Her first novel, Vacation, was also published by McSweeney's, in 2007.

She has taught creative writing and literature at Wesleyan University, the School of the Art Institute of Chicago, and the University of Kansas. She is currently a professor at the University of Texas at Austin, for the Michener Center and the New Writers Project.

Her work has appeared in Harper's, The New York Times, The Paris Review, Granta, McSweeney's, The Believer, The Boston Review, Esquire, and other magazines. She is a frequent contributor to Noon. She also has received four Pushcart Prizes.

== Prison education ==
In 2015 she founded the Pen City Writers, a creative writing program at a maximum-security prison in south Texas. Some of the students have won awards and been published in various magazines. For this work she won the 2017 Texas Governor's Criminal Justice Service Award and the inaugural American Short Fiction's Community Star Award.

== Books ==
- Minor Robberies (short stories, McSweeney's), 2007
- Vacation (novel, McSweeney's), 2008
- Revolution (memoir, Henry Holt), 2011
- I, Parrot (graphic novel) with Elizabeth Haidle, 2017
- Wait Till You See Me Dance (story collection, Graywolf Press), 2017
- Barn 8, (novel, Graywolf Press), 2020
- Earth 7, (novel, Graywolf Press,) 2026

== Awards ==
- Pushcart Prize, 2005
- Creative Capital Grant for Literature, 2009
- First Novelist Award for Vacation, 2009
- National Book Critics Award finalist for Revolution, 2012
- Pushcart Prize, 2011
- Pushcart Prize for "Likeable", 2014
- St. Francis Literary Prize Finalist
- Pushcart Prize, 2016
- Guggenheim Fellowship, 2018

== Online texts ==
=== Nonfiction ===
- Memoir Manifesto
- Where I Write
- "The Stipend," The Paris Review

=== Short fiction ===
- Minor Robberies

=== Interviews ===
- Interview with The Coachella Review
- Interview with the Texas Book Festival
- Interview on BOMB
- Interview on The Rumpus
- Interview on HTMLGIANT
- Interview on Bookslut with Tao Lin
- 2011 radio interview (50 minutes) at The Bat Segundo Show
- "I Start From a Place of Outrage and Sadness": A conversation on humor in fiction with Elisa Albert, Steve Almond, Brock Clarke, Sam Lipsyte, Zachary Martin, John McNally, and Deb Olin Unferth in Gulf Coast: A Journal of Literature and Fine Arts (24.2)
