= Sam Lipsyte =

American novelist

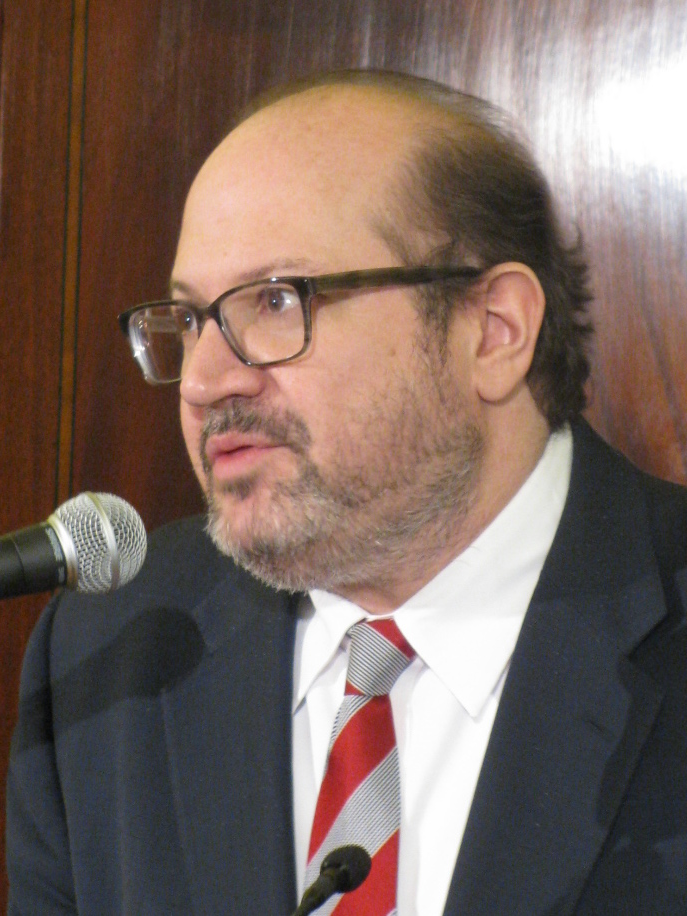
- Lipsyte in 2014
- Born: 1968 (age 57–58); New York City, U.S.
- Education: Brown University (BA)
- Occupation: Professor
- Relatives: Robert Lipsyte (father)
- Writing career
- Genres: novelist, short story writer
- Notable awards: New York Times Notable Book of the Year, Believer Book Award

Sam Lipsyte (born 1968) is an American novelist and short story writer.

== Early life and education ==
The son of the sports journalist Robert Lipsyte, Sam Lipsyte was born in New York City and raised in Closter, New Jersey, where he attended Northern Valley Regional High School at Demarest. He attended Brown University, receiving a Bachelor of Arts in English in 1990. At Brown, Lipsyte lived with Steven Johnson.

== Career ==
Lipsyte was an editor at the webzine FEED. His fiction and nonfiction have appeared in The Quarterly, The New Yorker, Harper's, Noon, Tin House, Open City, n+1, Slate, McSweeney's, Esquire, GQ, Bookforum, The New York Times Book Review, The Washington Post, The Los Angeles Times, Nouvelle Revue Française, The Paris Review, This Land, and Playboy, among other places.

Lipsyte's work is characterized by its verbal acumen and black humor. His books have been translated into several languages, including French, Russian, Italian, Spanish and Portuguese. His novel The Ask was published in the United States by Farrar, Straus and Giroux in 2010, and in the United Kingdom by Old Street Publishing. In May 2011, HBO announced development of a comedy, "People City," based on Lipsyte's work, with Lipsyte serving as writer and executive producer.

He lives in Manhattan and teaches fiction at Columbia University.

== Awards ==
His novel Home Land was a New York Times Notable Book of the Year for 2005 and winner of the inaugural 2004 Believer Book Award. Venus Drive was named one of the 25 Best Books of 2000 by The Village Voice Literary Supplement. In 2008, he received a Guggenheim Fellowship.

== Bibliography ==
=== Books ===
- Venus Drive, Open City Books, 2000, ISBN 978-1-890447-25-0
- The Subject Steve, Broadway Books, 2001, ISBN 978-0-7679-0885-6; reprint Random House, Inc., 2002, ISBN 978-0-7679-0917-4
- Home Land, Flamingo, 2004, ISBN 978-0-00-717036-4; Macmillan, 2005, ISBN 978-0-312-42418-3
- The Ask, Macmillan, 2010, ISBN 978-0-374-29891-3
- The Fun Parts, Farrar, Straus and Giroux, 2012, ISBN 978-0-374-29890-6
- Hark, Simon & Schuster, 2019, ISBN 978-1501146060
- Friend of the Pod, Gagosian, 2022, ISBN 978-1-951449-40-7 (novella)
- No One Left to Come Looking for You, Simon & Schuster, 2022, ISBN 978-1501146121

=== Articles and other contributions ===
- "April Fool's Day", The revolution will be accessorized: BlackBook presents dispatches from the new counterculture, Editor Aaron Hicklin, HarperCollins, 2006, ISBN 978-0-06-084732-6
- "Dear Miss Primatologist Lady", Four Letter Word: Invented Correspondence from the Edge of Modern Romance, Editors Rosalind Porter, Joshua Knelman, Simon and Schuster, 2008, ISBN 978-1-4165-6973-2
- Lipsyte, Sam (January 25, 2021). "Waiting for to-go". Shouts & Murmurs. The New Yorker. 96 (45): 26–27.
