= Diane Williams (author) =

American short-story writer and author

- Occupations: Short story, editor

Diane Williams (born 1946) is an American author, primarily of short stories. She lives in New York City and is the founder and editor of the literary annual NOON. She is the author of eleven books, including How High? — That High (Soho Press, 2021), for which she was interviewed by Merve Emre in The New Yorker. Her book The Collected Stories of Diane Williams was published by Soho Press in 2018.

== Life ==
Williams taught at Bard College, Syracuse University and The Center for Fiction in New York City.

== Career ==
A profile of Williams appeared in The New York Times in 2018, coincident with the publication of The Collected Stories of Diane Williams. Rumaan Alam wrote: "Erudite, elegant and stubbornly experimental. For any writer, an omnibus collection is a triumph. To see years of Ms. Williams’ confounding fictions collected in so hefty a volume is like seeing snowflakes accrue into an avalanche." Elsewhere, Williams' collected works was featured in The New York Review of Books, where Merve Emre wrote: "[Williams'] stories court laughter first, then, and only in retrospect, long-accumulated tears: tears of regret for opportunities lost, for people mislaid; tears of despair for the strangeness, the separateness that intimacy reveals and fails to overcome. You don't have to read all three hundred and five stories to get the point (Though you should. Williams can do more with two sentences than most writers can do with two hundred pages)." Maggie Doherty in The New Republic said, "Diane Williams seeks to stun, in something near the literal sense of the word . . . There are no first sentences full of orienting details, no dramatic dialogue, no neat epiphanies in a story's final lines. A concluding sentence is more likely to open up a story than to resolve it." In The Paris Review Williams was referred to as "the godmother of flash fiction."

Fine, Fine, Fine, Fine, Fine was published by McSweeney's in 2016. The Millions and Flavorwire listed it as one of the most anticipated books of 2016, and it received a starred review from Publishers Weekly. Her book, Vicky Swanky Is a Beauty, was published by McSweeney's in January 2012. The Boston Globe said "Vicky Swanky' is Williams at her best, shaking us awake again to the persistent strangeness of human life." Vanity Fair wrote "The shorts in Diane Williams' Vicky Swanky Is a Beauty emit an unsettling brilliance, becoming, on repeated readings, even stranger and more revelatory." Ben Marcus says of this work: "The uncanny has met its ideal delivery system: the stories of Diane Williams." Her 2007 collection, It Was Like My Trying to Have a Tender-Hearted Nature, was released by Fiction Collective Two.

In 2001, Dalkey published Romancer Erector: "Crafty, screwball, profound describes Diane Williams's Romancer Erector a trio of novellas and dozens of short stories featuring playful titles like 'I Freshly Fleshly'". In 2012, Romancer Erector was translated into the Swedish by Niclas Nilsson as Romantikus Erector, and published by Orosdi-Back. Torbjorn Elensky comments in Ord & Bild, Number 4: 2012 that "Anyone who writes or who is interested in prose as an art form should spend some time with her work. But even if you don't write, you should read her. The only thing you risk is that much of the supposedly poetic prose being published these days will seem flat after a few rounds with Diane Williams.

Her books have been reviewed in many publications, including the New York Times Book Review ("An operation worthy of a master spy, a double agent in the house of fiction") and The Los Angeles Times ("One of America's most exciting violators of habit is [Diane] Williams…the extremity that Williams depicts and the extremity of the depiction evoke something akin to the pity and fear that the great writers of antiquity considered central to literature. Her stories, by removing you from ordinary literary experience, place you more deeply in ordinary life. 'Isn't ordinary life strange?' they ask, and in so asking, they revivify and console.”)

Jonathan Franzen describes her as "one of the true living heroes of the American avant-garde. Her fiction makes very familiar things very, very weird." Ben Marcus suggested that her "outrageous and ferociously strange stories test the limits of behavior, of manners, of language, and mark Diane Williams as a startlingly original writer worthy of our closest attention."

Williams was the publisher and co-editor of StoryQuarterly from 1985 to 1997. She has been the publisher and founding editor of NOON since 2000. In January 2016, Rachel Syme of The New York Times described it as "a beautiful annual that remains staunchly avant-garde in its commitment to work that is oblique, enigmatic and impossible to ignore. . .stories that leave a flashbulb's glow behind the eyes even as they resist sense." On October 30, 2009, The Times Literary Supplement reviewed NOON in its Learned Journals. Alison Kelly wrote,

[T]he best stories in NOON are, indeed, stunning, in the sense that they leave one conscious of powerful meanings not yet fully absorbed. . . . [T]he journal has proved its staying power and achieved a respected position. . . NOON has intellectual weight. Over the years it has investigated, and pushed the boundaries of, the means and processes of communication. . . . Williams's editorial vision ensures the intelligence and integrity of the journal as a whole.

== Books ==
- This Is About the Body, the Mind, the Soul, the World, Time, and Fate (Grove Weidenfeld, 1990).
- Some Sexual Success Stories Plus Other Stories in Which God Might Choose to Appear (Grove Weidenfeld, 1992)
- The Stupefaction (Alfred A. Knopf, 1996)
- Excitability: Selected Stories (Dalkey Archive Press, 1998)
- Romancer Erector (Dalkey Archive Press, 2001) ISBN 9781564783127, OCLC 51000446
- It Was Like My Trying to Have a Tender-Hearted Nature: A Novella and Stories (FC2, 2007).
- Vicky Swanky Is a Beauty (McSweeney's, 2012)
- Fine, Fine, Fine, Fine, Fine (McSweeney's, 2016) ISBN 9781940450858 , OCLC 937371214
- The Collected Stories of Diane Williams (Soho Press, 2018) ISBN 9781616959821, OCLC 1019648073; includes stories from the above volumes and 16 newer stories
- How High? — That High (Soho Press, 2021) ISBN 9781641293068
- I Hear You're Rich (Soho Press, 2023) ISBN 9781641294782
- I Liked Rex (New York Review Books, 2026) ISBN 9798896230816

=== Short fiction ===
Title	Year	First published in	Reprinted in
My First Real Home	2008	Post Road 16 (Fall/Win 2008)	Harper's Magazine 318/1904 (Jan 2009)
