= Alternative literature =

Literary movement

Alternative literature (or alt-lit) is a literary movement strongly influenced by internet culture and online publishing. It includes various forms of prose, poetry, and new media. Alt-lit is characterized by autofiction, self-publication, and a presence on social media networks. Alternative literature brings together people with a common interest in the online publishing world.

== Origins ==
The term was first used to refer to this community of writers in the summer of 2011, when Tumblr and Twitter accounts named "Alt Lit Gossip" emerged, created by Cory Stephens (@outmouth). The accounts covered writers from presses and publications such as Muumuu House, Pop Serial, and HTMLgiant in a style akin to celebrity gossip sources like TMZ. After a few months the original accounts were deleted; they were revived by Frank Hinton in the fall of 2011, and began to gain popularity.

== Shared traits across Alt Lit ==
Alt Lit is often characterized by self-publication, self-promotion, and the maintenance of a presence on social media networks. Josh Soilker has said that Alt Lit is "in blog posts, videos, gchats and Facebook status updates. In PDFs and folded papers..." and that the movement's principal figures were Tao Lin, Noah Cicero and Brandon Scott Gorrell.

Alt Lit writers share Gmail chat logs, image macros, screenshots, and tweets, which are then self-published as poetry books and/or novels.

Writing for the New Yorker, Kenneth Goldsmith characterized Alt Lit writing as "marked by direct speech, expressions of aching desire, and wide-eyed sincerity". He also noted that Alt Lit is "usually written in the Internet vernacular of lowercase letters, inverted punctuation, abundant typos, and bad grammar".

== Authors and works ==
=== Literary magazines and blogs ===
Online and print Alt Lit magazines include SWAY Press, Illuminati Girl Gang, New Wave Vomit, Pop Serial, Shabby Doll House, Have U Seen My Whale, The Bushwick Review, The Mall, Keep This Bag Away From Children, Everyday Genius, Metazen, Housefire, UP Literature, Parlor, Sadcore Dadwave, Red Lightbulbs, In Parentheses and Unsure if i will allow my beard to grow for much longer.

Alt Lit news and creative blogs include Alt Lit Gossip, I Am Alt Lit, Internet Poetry, HTMLGiant, Beach Sloth, Allthemacchs, Heartcloud, FRXTL, Cutty Spot, and Alt Lit Press.

=== Presses and books ===
Presses publishing Alt Lit writing include Muumuu House, Civil Coping Mechanisms, Sorry House, Habitat, Boost House, Lazy Fascist, Macro, Nap, Scrambler Books, Publishing Genius, and Plain Wrap Press.

Two anthologies of Alt Lit writing are The Yolo Pages (2014, Boost House) and 40 Likely To Die Before 40: An Introduction to Alt Lit (2014, Civil Coping Mechanisms).

More than 150 books, e-books, and zines of Alt Lit writing, mostly self-published, have been catalogued on the Tumblr blog Alt Lit Library. Mellow Pages Library in Bushwick, Brooklyn, offers a wide selection of Alt Lit titles and hosts Alt Lit readings and book releases.

=== Authors ===
Alt Lit authors include Sam Forster, Jacob M. Appel, Megan Boyle, Melissa Broder, Ben Brooks, Blake Butler, Marie Calloway, Jos Charles, Brendan Connell, Noah Cicero, Claire Donato, Horse eBooks, Joshua Jennifer Espinoza, Mira Gonzalez, Jamie Iredell, Tao Lin, Scott McClanahan, Spencer Madsen, Guillaume Morissette, Steve Roggenbuck, Tim Sanders, Lauren Oyler, and Patricia Lockwood.

== Related concepts and movements ==
Many writers and critics in and around the Alt Lit community have proposed different labels to be used in conjunction with or in place of "Alt Lit."

=== New Sincerity ===
Some critics have linked Alt Lit writers with New Sincerity, to the point of using the terms interchangeably. Notable Alt Lit writers such as Steve Roggenbuck, Spencer Madsen and Tao Lin have also been grouped under the label "New Sincerity", but many Alt Lit writers reject the influence of David Foster Wallace and prominent mainstream exponents of a "New Sincerity" such as Jonathan Franzen.

The New Sincerity connection entails the use of an array of literary techniques intended to create the impression of "sincere" communication, ranging from autobiography, self-revision and a conversational tone to minimal punctuation and sans-serif fonts.

=== Autofiction ===
Many Alt Lit writers, including Megan Boyle and Tao Lin, write autobiographical fiction or autofiction.

=== Electronic literature ===
Electronic literature (or e-lit, pronounced ee-litt) is an older field including any literary work explicitly written to be read on a digital computer or network. What scholar Leonardo Flores calls third generation electronic literature - literary works that use social media and other popular platforms - would include many works that are also thought of as alt.lit.
