= Elisa Gabbert =

American poet and essayist

- Born: 1979 (age 46–47); Texas, United States
- Education: Rice University (BA); Emerson College (MFA)
- Occupations: Poet and essayist
- Writing career
- Language: English
- Period: 2008–present
- Notable work: The Unreality of Memory: And Other Essays (2020)
- Notable awards: 2026 Guggenheim Fellowship in General Nonfiction
- Website: www.elisagabbert.com

Elisa Gabbert (born 1979) is an American poet, essayist, and critic. She is the author of seven collections, most recently Any Person Is the Only Self (Farrar, Straus and Giroux, 2024), and writes the “On Poetry” column for The New York Times.

Her writing has appeared in Poetry, Harper's, The Paris Review, The Believer, the New York Review of Books, A Public Space, and The Yale Review. In 2026, Gabbert received a Guggenheim Fellowship.

== Early life and education ==
Gabbert grew up in El Paso, Texas. She attended Rice University, where she majored in linguistics and cognitive sciences. At Rice, Gabbert studied under the poet Susan Wood, to whom she attributes her career trajectory and decision to pursue an MFA. In a 2016 essay, she describes learning about the September 11 attacks from Houston and recalls there being a pervasive feeling of "unreality" on Rice's campus.

She later earned an MFA in creative writing from Emerson College. In collaboration with fellow cohort member Kathleen Rooney, she co-wrote several chapbooks, including That Tiny Insane Voluptuousness (Otoliths, 2008) and The Kind of Beauty That Has Nowhere to Go (Hyacinth Girl, 2013).

== Career ==
Outside of her writing practice, Gabbert works as a content director.

During her career, she was based in Denver, Boston, and now lives in Providence, Rhode Island, with her husband, the writer John Cotter.

=== Poetry ===
Her 2010 debut poetry collection, The French Exit, was published by the small press Birds, LLC. It received a positive review from Ben Mirov in BOMB Magazine, who described the collection as "a remarkable first book that knows exactly what it wants from poems and how to achieve it, over and over."

Gabbert published three books with Black Ocean Press from 2013 to 2018: The Self Unstable (2013), L’Heure Bleue, or the Judy Poems (2016), and The Word Pretty (2018). L'Heure Bleue is written from the perspective of Judy, one of the characters in Wallace Shawn’s play The Designated Mourner.

Her 2022 poetry collection Normal Distance (Soft Skull Press) was an American Booksellers Association Indie Gift Guide pick and Literary Hub Most Anticipated Book of the Year, receiving praise from Nylon, Electric Literature, Vulture, and Ploughshares.

Her poem "Here Lies Dust" was The Yale Review's most-read poem of 2024.

=== Essays and criticism ===
In The New Yorker’s year-end review, Teju Cole named The Self Unstable one of the best books of 2013.

In February 2020, The New York Times announced Gabbert's appointment as its poetry columnist, succeeding David Orr's 15-year tenure. She wrote her first “On Poetry” column in March 2020.

The Unreality of Memory (FSG Originals, 2020), an essay collection, was a Colorado Book Award Finalist and New York Times Editor's Choice. It received a Kirkus starred review and made several magazines' year-end lists, including Huffington Post, Grand Journal, Thrillist, and Electric Literature. In an interview with The Rice Thresher, Gabbert said the collection emerged from her preoccupation with the relationship between disaster and cognition, specifically "how tragedy, though endlessly documented, remains difficult to fully grasp or make real." She began working on it during the time of Donald Trump's first election, which she said gave her a "real urgent sense" to write about "climate catastrophe [and the] ways that it seemed like reality and the systems around me were falling apart."

In 2025, Any Person Is the Only Self was long-listed for the PEN/Diamonstein-Spielvogel Award for the Art of the Essay. The collection named one of the Brooklyn Public Library's "Favorite Books from 2024," and it also appeared on The Washington Post's "50 Notable Works of Nonfiction from 2024" list, Nora Biette-Timmons for Jezebel's "Best (New) Books I Read in 2024" list, and Paste's "Best Non-Fiction Books and Memoirs of 2024" list.

==== "Should White Men Stop Writing?" ====
In 2015, Gabbert, as Electric Literature's advice columnist, published an article titled "Should White Men Stop Writing?" The piece responded to a letter from a "white, male poet who is aware of his privilege and sensitive to inequalities facing women, POC, and LGBTQ individuals" who questioned whether "the time to write from [his] experience has passed." Gabbert advised him to continue writing while thinking of it as "carbon offsets": reading more books by marginalized authors and avoiding impolite behavior when submitting to magazine editors (something she noted, from experience, that men were more likely to engage in).

The article received widespread attention and sparked controversy within the literary community. Several publications responded, including The Atlantic and National Review. In a subsequent interview with Electric Literature, Gabbert addressed critiques from "white male writers" who found her advice "not fair" and offensive, stating: "if you try to explain that the existing system is tragically unfair to women, POC, LGBTQ, etc., they either won't accept it or don't care. Only caring about 'fairness' when it negatively affects you is just toddler behavior."

The National Review's rebuttal also garnered significant attention. The author criticized her perspective, writing that "Gabbert's view of art destroys art's universality" and calling it "lunacy" (also noting that Gabbert is a self-described “militant feminist”).

Gabbert was later interviewed about her article and its reception for Vulture.

=== Social media presence ===
Gabbert is known within the online literary community for her social media presence and humor. Poetry Magazine praised Gabbert's former blog, The French Exit, in a 2013 post, noting that "Gabbert totally owns the list post genre." In an interview for The Rumpus, Gabbert reflected on her relationship to "literary Twitter" and her grievances about social media's limitations. She wrote in a 2015 essay for The Smart Set that "Twitter has made my poetry more aphoristic. Formally, it's a platform ideally suited to the aphorism; in fact aphorisms should be quite a bit less than 140 characters." A selection of her Twitter posts was edited by Tao Lin for Muumuu House.

On her internet reception, Gabbert said in an interview with Lincoln Michel for BOMB Magazine: "Over the years as I’ve gotten more followers I’ve realized that at least two of these functions [using Twitter as a public notebook and to promote work] are really at odds with each other—it's nice to have more people to tell when I have a new book out, or whatever, but it's much harder to be spontaneous and vulnerable and even interesting when I’ve lost all sense of who is actually reading my tweets." A 2025 article by Tyrant Books editor Jordan Castro for The Paris Review on Ayn Rand begins with a reference to a Twitter post by Gabbert.

== Work and publications ==
=== Essays ===
- Gabbert, E. (2024). Any Person is the Only Self. New York, NY: Farrar, Straus and Giroux.
- Gabbert, E. (2018). The Word Pretty. Boston, MA: Black Ocean Press.
- Gabbert, E. (2020). The Unreality of Memory: And Other Essays. New York City, NY: Farrar, Straus and Giroux.

=== Poetry ===
- Gabbert, E. (2022). Normal Distance. New York, NY: Soft Skull Press.
- Gabbert, E. (2016). L’Heure Bleue, or the Judy Poems. Boston, MA: Black Ocean Press.
- Gabbert, E. (2010). The French Exit. Raleigh, NC: Birds, LLC.

=== Hybrid ===
- Gabbert, E. (2013). The Self Unstable. Boston, MA: Black Ocean Press.
