= Fuccboi (novel) =

2022 novel by Sean Thor Conroe

- Author: Sean Thor Conroe
- Publication date: 2022
- Publication place: United States
- ISBN: 0-316-39501-3

Fuccboi is the debut novel of American writer Sean Thor Conroe, published in 2022. An autofiction that mixes "bro-speak" with more formal registers, the novel follows a delivery driver and aspiring writer who has the same name as the author. It received generally positive reviews and provoked discussion of the portrayal of masculinity.

== Development and style ==
Fuccboi was edited by Giancarlo DiTrapano of Tyrant Books. It is an autofiction that is prone to "bro-speak", with heavy influences from African-American Vernacular English. The book's use of slang and bro-speak is thought to be somewhat self-satirical. The protagonist also mixes this bro-speak with other dialects, using online abbreviations and the word "atop". Female characters in the book are delineated by their role and "bae", giving "editor bae" or "ex bae", while male characters are known by a single letter.

Each chapter is named after the protagonist's identity at various points throughout the book.

== Synopsis ==
The book follows one Sean Thor Conroe, a protagonist who shares his name with the book's author. Sean is portrayed to be a delivery driver in Philadelphia with hopes of becoming an author. He lives with a "roomie bro", with whom he talks about the nuances of gender and its politics. He walked across the contiguous United States in 2014, and is trying to publish a book about it with "editor bae". Sean also develops an extreme skin condition which he sees a dermatologist for, whom he refers to as "derm bae" and develops romantic feelings for.

== Reception ==
The book was described by reviewers as compelling, if cringeworthy. Jonathan McAloon with the Financial Times writes that if Conroe's prose "sounds insufferable, that's because it largely is, both with and without context. But from these quotes it's hard to give a sense of how funny, clever and infectious Conroe's writing can be". Writing for The New York Times, Jonah E. Bromwich says that the book is "liable to provoke mockery", but also that Conroe is "able to capture evocative moments in a fresh voice".

Bromwich also writes that Conroe blurs the divide between him and his character. In their attitude towards women, Bromwich sees a similarity between the character's assertion that being a woman is beneficial because women can be paid to be mothers, and the author's designation of most women into caretaker roles. McAloon takes a different tack, writing that the author is simply so focused on the character that he fails to develop the supporting characters.

Alec Gewirtz with Los Angeles Review of Books writes that "Our narrator's slangy bravado may be a little cringey and his hypermasculinity just a bit sus, but he is also endlessly charming, particularly in his willingness to mock his own swaggering persona."

In a review for Gawker, Hanson O'Haver wrote that the novel "captures nothing of our current moment" in a largely negative review which found it falling short of Conroe's other influences including Karl Ove Knausgaard, Roberto Bolaño, and David Foster Wallace.

Rob Doyle of The Guardian talks about how Conroe is challenged to "update the tradition of the American male autobiographical novelist", yet avoid "censoring himself into insipidity." He also notes that "Fuccboi's main claim to newness lies in the narrator's middle-way attitude to the ball-aching social justice religion that clogs the air of American cultural life."

In a negative review of Fuccboi and The Delivery by Peter Mendelsund published by The Cleveland Review of Books, Preston DeGarmo criticized the short-form paragraphs found in each book.
