= Preparation for the Next Life =

2014 novel by Atticus Lish

- First edition
- Author: Atticus Lish
- Language: English
- Publisher: Tyrant Books
- Publication date: 2014
- Publication place: United States
- ISBN: 978-0-991-36082-6

Preparation for the Next Life is a 2014 work of fiction by American author Atticus Lish. It won the 2015 PEN/Faulkner Award for Fiction, and the 2016 Grand Prix de Littérature Américaine. The judges of the 2015 PEN/Faulkner Award praised the book for its blend of documentary detail and "incantation," stating that it "scours and illuminates the vast, traumatized America that lives, works and loves outside the castle gates."

It was adapted into a film by Bing Liu, which is set to be released in September 2025.

Preparation for the Next Life is set mostly in Flushing, Queens, and follows two new arrivals to the city. Zou Lei is an illegal immigrant from the Chinese province of Xinjiang, daughter of a Uighur mother and a Han father. Brad Skinner is a Pennsylvania-born veteran of the Iraq war. While struggling to survive in New York's underground economy, Zou Lei meets Skinner, who is suffering from untreated combat trauma. Their attempts to build a life together, overcoming the violence, predation, and alienation surrounding them, amount to what The New York Times critic Dwight Garner has called "perhaps the finest and most unsentimental love story of the new decade".
