= Dunbarton High School =

Canadian secondary school

Location
- 655 Sheppard Avenue; Pickering, Ontario, L1V 1G2; Canada; 43.8214°N 79.1181°W

Information
- School type: High school
- Motto: Conari Quaerere Invenire (To Try, To Seek, To Come Upon)
- Founded: 1961; 65 years ago
- School board: Durham District School Board
- Superintendent: M. Robinson
- Area trustee: Emma Cunningham & Stephen Linton
- Principal: David Sasseville
- Grades: 9-12
- Enrollment: 1,817 (2024/2025)
- Language: English, French
- Colours: Red, black and white
- Mascot: Spartan
- Feeder schools: Altona Forest Public School Elizabeth B. Phin Public School Fairport Beach Public School Frenchman's Bay Public School Gandatsetiagon Public School Highbush Public School Rosebank Road Public School Westcreek Public School Maple Ridge Public School
- Website: www.ddsb.ca/school/dunbartonhs/Pages/default.aspx

Dunbarton High School is located in Pickering, Ontario, Canada, and is part of the Durham District School Board. The school has students in grades 9-12 and offers a wide range of academic and extracurricular activities. Their mascot is the Spartan.

Dunbarton consists of two campuses: Main Campus and South Campus, which it acquired after the closing of Woodlands Centennial Public School. The classes in south campus include English, visual art, music, drama, and dance.

== Stabbing ==
On February 23, 2016, a mass stabbing occurred at the school. Nine people — six students and three staff members — were injured. A 14-year-old girl (whose identity is protected by the Youth Criminal Justice Act) was arrested in connection with the stabbing.

== Notable alumni ==
- Sean Avery, retired NHL player
- Cristine Brache, visual artist, writer and filmmaker
- Rex Bromfield, writer and director
- Valri Bromfield, actress and comedian
- Shelley-Ann Brown, Olympic bobsledder
- Josie Dye, radio and television personality
- Jeff Geddis, (Bryan Stiles)
- Anson Henry, Canadian track and field athlete, 2004 Athens Summer Olympics, 2008 Beijing Summer Olympics
- Nikkita Holder, Canadian track and field athlete, 2012 London Summer Olympics
- John Moonlight, Captain of Canada's rugby team
- Jaime Peters, soccer player for Ipswich Town and Team Canada
- Brad Phillips, visual artist, novelist and essayist
- Sean Pierson, mixed martial artist for the Ultimate Fighting Championship
- Adil Shamasdin, professional tennis player, Wimbledon Quarter-Finalist, former top 50 in the world.
- Sarah Slean, singer-songwriter, painter, and photographer
- Brennan Othmann, NHL first round pick and Team Canada World Junior gold medalist
- Jennifer Wakefield, Olympic hockey player

== See also ==
- Education in Ontario
- List of secondary schools in Ontario
