= Audun Mortensen =

Norwegian writer and artist

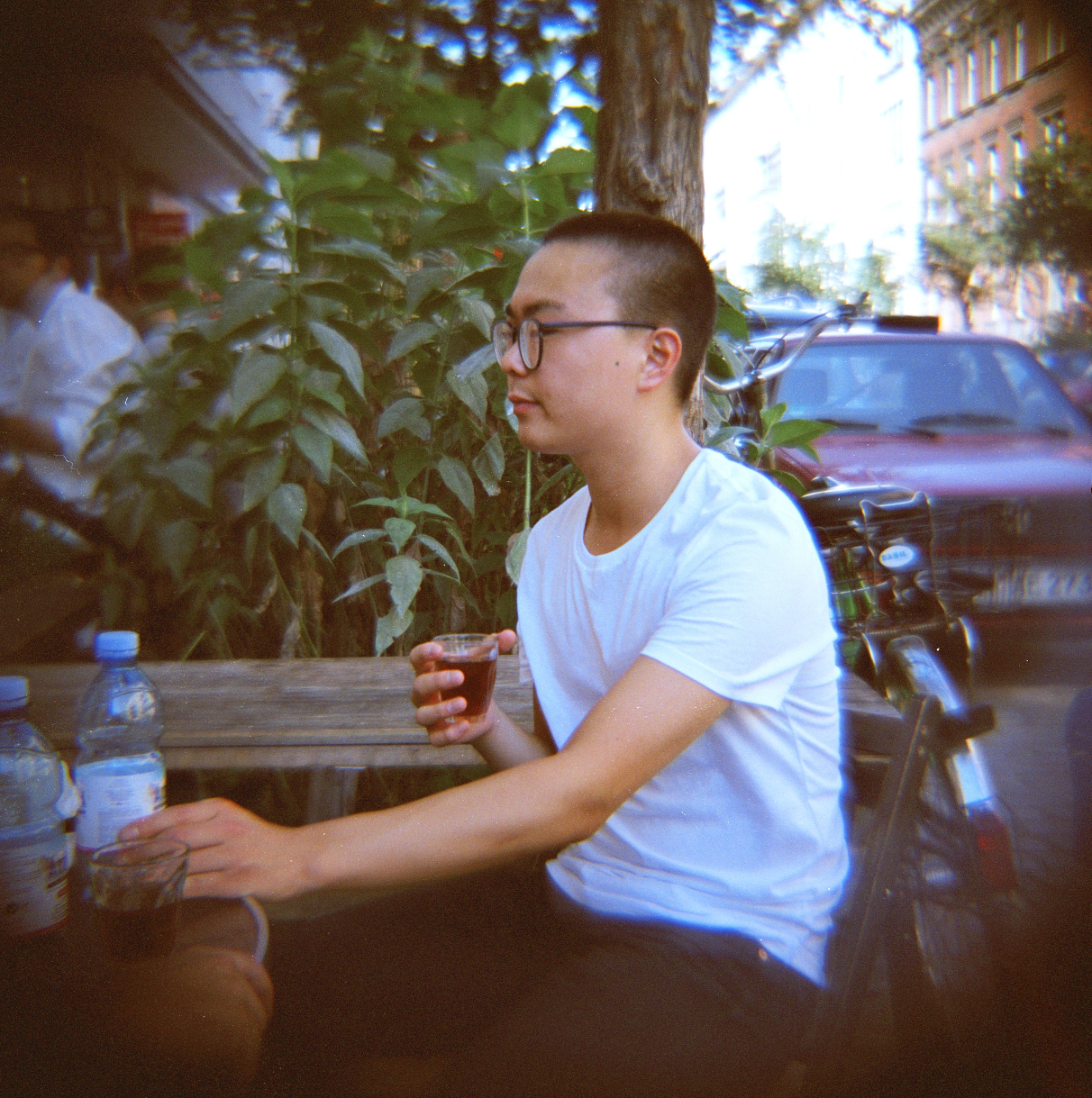
Audun Mortensen

Audun Mortensen (born 24 November 1985) is a Norwegian writer and artist. Mortensen has published ten books with Flamme Forlag, and, as an artist, has been included in several exhibitions, including at the Gagosian Gallery in New York City.

Mortensen was born in Seoul, South Korea.

== Bibliography ==
- Alle forteller meg hvor bra jeg er i tilfelle jeg blir det, Flamme Forlag (2009), ISBN 9788202314972
- Roman, Flamme Forlag (2010), ISBN 9788202335984
- Surf's Up, Traumawien (2010)
- This Year's Model, Atelier Series (2011)
- Aaliyah, Flamme Forlag (2011), ISBN 9788202350291
- The Collected Jokes of Slavoj Žižek, Flamme Forlag (2012), ISBN 9788202391799
- 27 519 tegn med mellomrom, Flamme Forlag (2013), ISBN 9788282880053
- Žižek's Jokes, MIT Press (2014), ISBN 9780262026710
- Dyr jeg har møtt, Flamme Forlag (2014), ISBN 9788282880510
- Samleren, Flamme Forlag (2015), ISBN 978-82-8288-110-4
- Nylig historikk, Flamme Forlag (2016), ISBN 978-82-8288-168-5
- Fire dager i Berlin, Flamme Forlag (2017), ISBN 978-82-8288-247-7
- Fotballspillere som rimer, Flamme Forlag (2018), ISBN 978-82-8288-309-2
- Footballers who rhyme, If a leaf falls (2018), edited by Sam Riviere
- Forventninger til ny teknologi, Flamme Forlag (2018), ISBN 978-82-8288-313-9

== Authorship ==
Mortensen's debut book, Alle forteller meg hvor bra jeg er i tilfelle jeg blir det (Everyone Tells Me How Great I Am in Case I Become It), was named 2009's best debut poetry book by Norway's largest newspaper, Aftenposten. Mortensen has been called "Norway's most modern author" and has been named one of the country's 30 young talents by Dagens Næringsliv. In 2011 he self-published his coffee table book The Collected Jokes of Slavoj Zizek, which he later sold to MIT Press, which republished his work in numerous languages under the title Zizek's Jokes

Flamme Forlag published Mortensen's novel Samleren – in English, The Collector – in October 2015. The book was later publicly announced by Mortensen to be a remake of the novel The Burnt Orange Heresy (1971) by American writer Charles Willeford.

Willeford's novel was according to Mortensen, translated with Google Translate. Mortensen himself leaked the information about his method and intention, first during a lecture, then in an interview.

Following a prolonged public debate about the book, the publisher retracted the book May 13, 2017, and paid an unknown amount to the Charles Willeford's estate. However, the publisher uphold their opinion that the book could not be understood as ordinary plagiarism. The publisher insisted that the book was meant to address a grey area that they wanted to be debated.

When the book was retracted from the market, Mortensen sold two copies of his book on Finn.

== Translations ==
- Jeg elsker deg (I Am Going to Clone Myself Then Kill the Clone and Eat It, by Sam Pink), Flamme Forlag (2010)
- Ut og stjæle fra American Apparel (Shoplifting from American Apparel, by Tao Lin), Cappelen Damm (2011), ISBN 9788202327330
