= Spencer Madsen =

American poet

Spencer Madsen is a contemporary American poet and small press publisher. He is a Brooklyn-based contemporary writer as well as the founding editor of Sorry House, an independent publishing press in New York City. Madsen is part of a genre of independent poetry that is unique in its association with the New Sincerity movement as well as its use of social media platforms as its main source of publicity. He is described by The Fader magazine as "a writer who will, with equal enthusiasm, tweet a selfie of his butt and write the sincerest, saddest line of poetry you've ever read."

== Poetry ==
The notice of Madsen's poetry began with him posting a photo someone had taken of his 2010 self-published book A Million Bears on Tumblr, which reached over 10,000 notes in the first 24-hour period. After reaching 300,000 notes The Huffington Post featured the excerpted poem online, dubbing it the "Sad Cat Poem". In an interview with Adam Humphreys at Thought Catalog, Madsen said that A Million Bears was out of print at the time of this spike in Tumblr publicity, but he later issued a second edition with a new cover.

A second book of poetry from Spencer Madsen entitled You Can Make Anything Sad was published by Publishing Genius on April 29, 2014. It received advanced praise from Dennis Cooper. In a review at Dazed, Lauren Oyler said "There's a disconnect between the narcissism Madsen and his alt-lit contemporaries have been accused of and the truly original insights you find yourself reading." At Vice, Madsen interviewed New York Tyrant publisher Giancarlo DiTrapano about his experience reading Madsen's book. Paper Magazine named You Can Make Anything Sad one of five "Indie Poetry Books That Even Non-Lit People Will Love."

== Publishing ==
In early 2013, Madsen founded Sorry House, an independent, small press publishing company. Sorry House's debut publication was I will never be beautiful enough to make us beautiful together by Mira Gonzalez, released on January 31, 2013. In February 2013, the company published Joke Book by Victor Vazquez. Sorry House "transformed into a legitimate business" in early 2014 by becoming a limited liability company.

In an interview with Monkeybicycle, Madsen cited Dalkey Archive, Melville House Publishing, Grove Press, Muumuu House, and others as publishing influences. On March 12, 2014, Madsen published an article called "I Made the Mistake of Starting a Small Press and So Can You" that guides others to create their own small press.

== Personal life ==
Spencer Madsen (along with his brother Tyler Madsen) were conceived through in vitro fertilization (IVF).
