= Fuck boy =

Fuck boy and variants are slang terms for a womanizer. It was named the American Dialect Society's most outrageous word of the year in 2015.

Fuck boy, fuckboy, fuckboi, or fuccboi may also refer to:

- Fuccboi (novel), a 2022 novel by Sean Thor Conroe
- Fuccbois, a 2019 LGBTQ film directed by Eduardo Roy Jr.
- "Fuck Boy", a 2015 Trina song, released re-mixed on the 2019 album The One
- "Fuckboy", a 2021 song by Dixie D'Amelio
- "Fuckboy", a 2017 single by Mila J from the album Dopamine
- "Fuckboi", a 2022 single by Electric Callboy featuring Conquer Divide
- "Fuckboi", a 2019 song by Zola
- "Fuccboi", a 2016 Bass Head Music single featuring Tech N9ne
- "Fuccboi", a 2019 single by Lil Jon
- "Fxxxboy", a 2026 song by Blackpink from the EP Deadline

== See also ==
- FBoy Island, a reality show
