= The Delivery (novel) =

2021 novel by Peter Mendelsund

- Author: Peter Mendelsund
- Language: English
- Publisher: Farrar, Straus and Giroux
- Publication date: 2021

The Delivery is a 2021 novel by American writer Peter Mendelsund. The novel follows an immigrant to an unnamed country who works as a bicycle messenger making deliveries.

== Publication ==
The cover of the hardcover edition was designed by Alex Merto.

== Reception ==
In a review published by The New York Times Book Review book review, Andy Newman praised the novel as "often exquisite". However, Newman criticized Mendelsund's insertion of a narrator whose stories about his own life become longer as the novel continues.

In a review of The Delivery and Fuccboi by Sean Thor Conroe published by The Cleveland Review of Books, Preston DeGarmo criticized the book's reliance on crots or "minigraphs." In a positive review published by the Los Angeles Review of Books, Alessandro Tersigni praised the form of the novel and the "design" of the book's prose.
