= Shoplifting from American Apparel =

2009 novel by Tao Lin

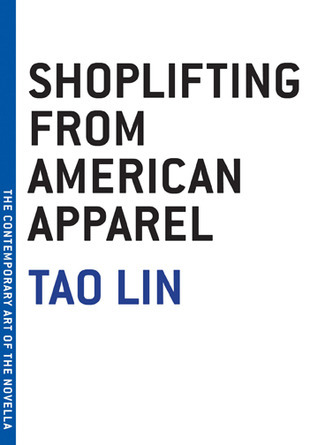

Shoplifting from American Apparel, or simply Shoplifting, is Tao Lin's first novella, fifth book, and first published fiction since the May 15, 2007, simultaneous publication of his debut novel, Eeeee Eee Eeee, and debut story collection, Bed.

Shoplifting is based on a short story first published in Vice Magazine's second annual fiction issue. The book is a largely autobiographical slice-of-life about a young aspiring author and occasional shoplifter named Sam.

Shoplifting was published on September 15, 2009, by Melville House Publishing and has received mixed reviews. A film adaptation was released in select theaters on December 7, 2012 through Ilikenirvana Productions. Foreign editions include a Norwegian edition (Cappelen Damm) translated by Audun Mortensen, and forthcoming Spanish (Alpha Decay) and French (Au Diable Vauvert) editions.
