= Trip (book) =

2018 nonfiction book by Tao Lin

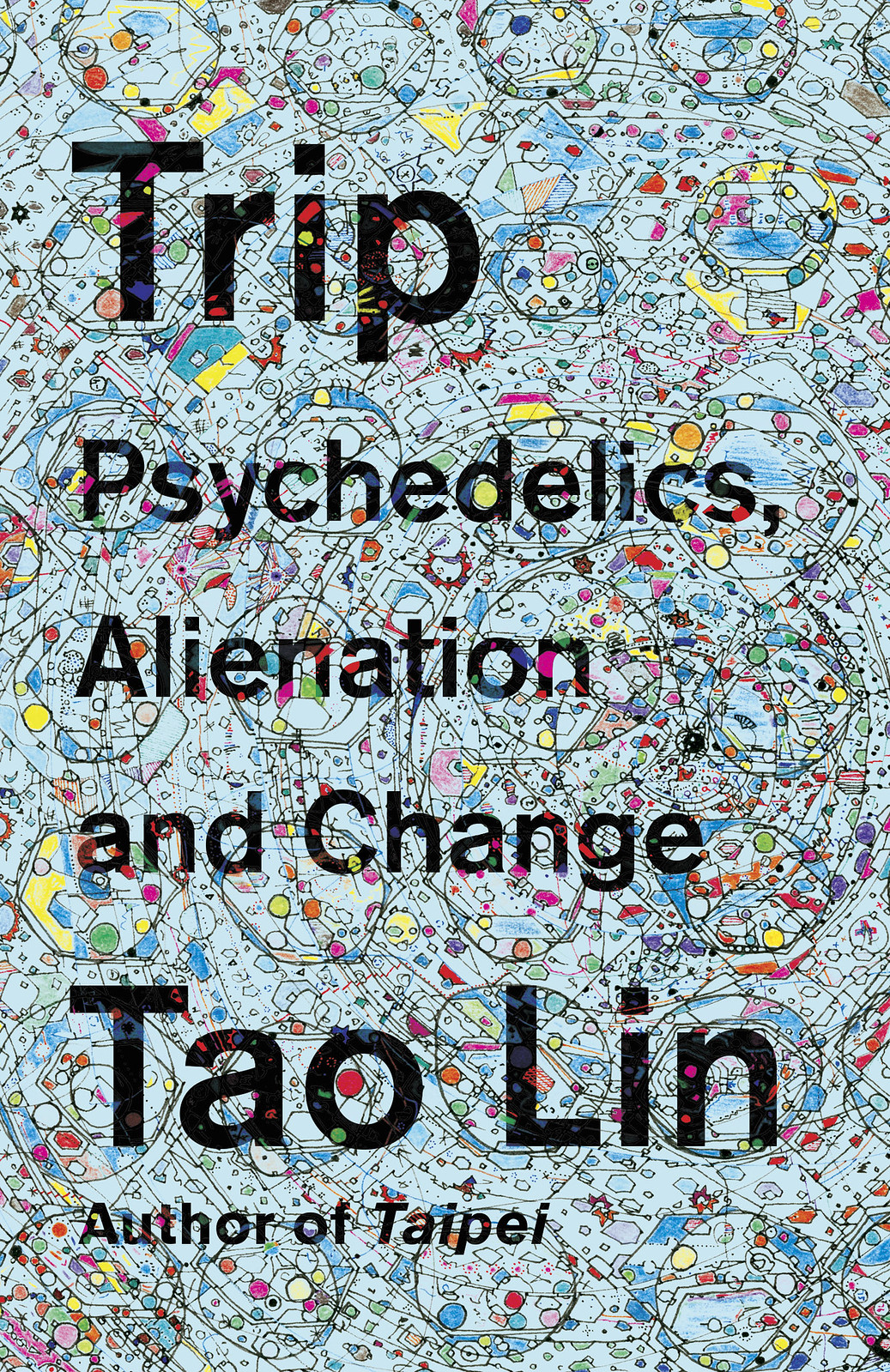
- First edition cover
- Author: Tao Lin
- Original title: Trip: Psychedelics, Alienation, and Change
- Language: English
- Genre: Nonfiction, memoir
- Published: May 1, 2018, Vintage Books
- Publication place: United States
- Media type: Book
- Pages: 320
- ISBN: 1101974516 (US)
- Preceded by: Taipei
- Followed by: Leave Society

Trip: Psychedelics, Alienation, and Change is a 2018 nonfiction book by Tao Lin. It is his first nonfiction book, and eighth book total.

== Cover ==
On January 9, 2018, Entertainment Weekly debuted the cover. The article also included an excerpt of the book in which Lin takes psilocybin mushrooms alone in his room and then emails a friend. The article stated that, "The jacket features Lin's own illustration, one that reflects the themes of chaos and art so intrinsic to the book." The art was one of Lin's mandalas.

== Summary ==
Trip is in eight chapters, with an introduction, epilogue, and appendix. The chapter titles are "Why Am I Interested in Him?", "Terence McKenna's Life", "My Drug History", "Psilocybin", "DMT", "Salvia", "Why Are Psychedelics Illegal?" and "Cannabis".

Lin describes getting addicted to pharmaceutical drugs and feeling suicidal due to his addiction and to the bleakness of his life and his society. At his lowest, he encounters the work of Terence McKenna, the psychedelics enthusiast. McKenna's philosophy changes Lin's perspective from pessimistic to optimistic. He relates his experiences with various psychedelic drugs, including psilocybin and DMT. At the end of the book, Lin visits McKenna's ex-wife Kathleen Harrison, an ethnobotanist. He takes a plant-drawing class with her and meets her children, Finn and Klea, that she had with McKenna.

== Release and reception ==
Trip was published on May 1, 2018. It received mostly positive reviews. Emily Witt, writing in the New Yorker, said, "Lin avoids writing in figurative language, and there is little hyperbole in these reports, nor references to nineteen-sixties-era acid metaphysics. 'Trip' is, if not a guide to self-help, a book about a person trying to be happier, in part by changing the kinds of drugs he uses." John Horgan, in Scientific American, wrote, "If an aspirant asks for an example of experimental science writing, I'll recommend Trip. The book veers from excruciatingly candid autobiography to biography (of McKenna) to investigative journalism…to interview-based journalism to philosophical speculation to first-person accounts of the effects of DMT and Salvia." In the Irish Times, Rob Doyle gave the book a mixed review, concluding, "Trip is a sane book about becoming sane, and Lin's most valuable work to date."

== Foreign editions ==
A French edition from Au Diable Vauvert was published in 2019.
