= Preparation for the Next Life (film) =

2025 American drama film

- Theatrical release poster
- Directed by: Bing Liu
- Screenplay by: Martyna Majok
- Based on: Preparation for the Next Life by Atticus Lish
- Produced by: Dede Gardner; Jeremy Kleiner; Adele Romanski; Barry Jenkins; Mark Ceryak
- Starring: Sebiye Behtiyar; Fred Hechinger
- Cinematography: Ante Cheng
- Edited by: Anne McCabe
- Music by: Emile Mosseri
- Production companies: Orion Pictures; Plan B Entertainment; Pastel
- Distributed by: Amazon MGM Studios
- Release date: September 5, 2025
- Running time: 116 minutes
- Country: United States
- Language: English
- Budget: $20 million
- Box office: $43,421

Preparation for the Next Life is a 2025 American drama film directed by Bing Liu, from a screenplay by Martyna Majok. It is based upon the 2014 novel by Atticus Lish. It stars Sebiye Behtiyar and Fred Hechinger.

It was released on September 5, 2025, by Amazon MGM Studios.

== Premise ==
A Uyghur Muslim migrant to New York lives a meagre existence laboring in Chinatown’s underground kitchens, but her future suddenly becomes hopeful when she falls in love with an American soldier.

== Cast ==
- Sebiye Behtiyar as Aishe
- Fred Hechinger as Skinner

== Production ==
In March 2023, it was announced Bing Liu would direct an adaption of Preparation for the Next Life by Atticus Lish, with Plan B Entertainment and Pastel producing, with Orion Pictures set to distribute. Principal photography took place in New York City.

== Release ==
It was released on September 5, 2025, by Amazon MGM Studios.

== Reception ==
=== Critical reception ===
On the review aggregator website Rotten Tomatoes, 96% of 25 critics' reviews are positive. Metacritic, which uses a weighted average, assigned the film a score of 83 out of 100, based on 12 critics, indicating "universal acclaim".

=== Accolades ===
Award	Date of ceremony	Category	Recipient	Result	Ref.
Gotham Independent Film Awards	December 1, 2025	Best Adapted Screenplay	Martyna Majok	Nominated	
Gotham Independent Film Awards	December 1, 2025	Breakthrough Performer	Sebiye Behtiyar	Nominated	
