= Leave Society =

2021 novel by Tao Lin

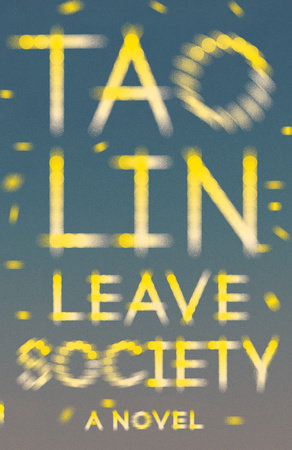
- First edition cover
- Author: Tao Lin
- Original title: Leave Society
- Language: English
- Genre: Autofiction, Literary fiction
- Published: August 3, 2021, Vintage Books
- Publication place: United States
- Media type: Book
- Pages: 368
- ISBN: 1101974478 (US)
- Preceded by: Trip

Leave Society is a 2021 novel by Tao Lin. It is his fourth novel, and tenth book overall.

== Cover ==
The cover, by Linda Huang, features what are described in the novel as "microfireflies" or "dustwinkling."

== Summary ==
Leave Society is in four parts, and is about a character named Li who is based on the author. The New York Times summarized the book as such: "Li has left behind speed, despair and his belief in Western medicine. (He refuses steroid shots for his back pain.) But what he is really recovering from is existentialism, the idea that life has no meaning other than what we give it. He now believes that the world has an inherent purpose. To get closer to its 'mystery,' and to feel less grumpy, he drops a lot of LSD and eats even more cannabis."

== Release and reception ==
Leave Society received rave reviews before its publication. In Spike Art Magazine, Dean Kissick wrote, "Rather than retreating into ourselves and our emotional subjectivity, which is the dominant approach in autofiction, social media, and the general contemporary condition, Lin writes to destroy the ego, to escape the atomisation of modern man and the feelings of despair, that life is meaninglessness and/or hopeless." In the Washington Examiner on July 22, Alex Perez wrote, "It will probably be ignored or misunderstood by the ideology-poisoned commentariat that rules over the society Li is trying to leave. It was up to Lin, a writer who for so long seemed completely disconnected from his humanity, to write the most deeply human book of the year." Publishers Weekly wrote: "Much of the action and descriptions are banal, and aside from the romance, this feels a bit too detached and devoid of emotion for a book ostensibly about learning to live. Lin’s fans might appreciate this, but it doesn’t offer anything new."

On the book's release date, in The New York Times Book Review, Christine Smallwood wrote of the main character, "Li has left behind speed, despair and his belief in Western medicine. (He refuses steroid shots for his back pain.) But what he is really recovering from is existentialism, the idea that life has no meaning other than what we give it. He now believes that the world has an inherent purpose ... Stylistically, the book is artful, even radical ... Despite, or perhaps because of, its virtues, the novel doesn’t hold the reader in its thrall. It meanders, linking scenes of low-key bickering in a gentle ebb and flow of harmony and disharmony. It doesn’t seem to mind if you put it down ... But the novel has a vision, however cracked, an idea connected to its form, which is more than I can say for most books."

Mixed and negative reviews followed, including in Bookforum and The New Yorker, where Andrea Long Chu wrote:

The first sentence of almost every chapter contains at least one number, often several, like a medical record: "Thirty tabs of LSD arrived on day thirty-five." This kind of prose can be elegant; it can also feel like dieting ... But it’s most interesting to consider the book’s flat affect as a curious, sidewise effect of Li’s linguistic relationship to his parents ... There is a translated quality to this kind of writing, as if Lin were rendering Mandarin word for word; in fact, given Li’s propensity for audio recordings, this is likely exactly what happened ... the effect he’s created is a kind of fastidious plotlessness, one whose accuracy to life, affected or not, has the ambivalent virtue of being, like life itself, mostly boring.

In a long review in the Los Angeles Review of Books, Lamorna Ash wrote:

Lin introduces a radical shift in outlook, a change from a posture of boredom to one of awe [...] The final sentence of Leave Society—"Li took a leaf"—echoes an earlier scene in which Li offers a leaf to his brother’s son. "What is it?" his nephew asks. "A leaf," Li tells him. "It’s just a tiny leaf." Literally, just a leaf, something that provokes awe by being nothing more than what it is. On my first reading of Leave Society, I did not know what, if anything, to make of the homophone "leaf" and "leave." On the second reading, when I was better accustomed to Lin’s humor and his delight in multiplicity, it seemed to me both metaphorical and literal, playful and quite serious, a brilliant, almost perfect ending.
