= Marie Calloway =

American author

- Writing career
- Genre: Literary fiction
- Notable work: what purpose did i serve in your life?

Marie Calloway is an American writer. Her first book, what purpose did i serve in your life?, was published by Tyrant Books and generated controversy. Part of the volume recounts the author's romantic relationship with a married journalist who she dubbed "Adrien Brody", and is reportedly based on an actual relationship with a prominent American writer. Daniel D'Addario of Salon said the article upon which the book was based "sent shockwaves through the publishing industry".

Calloway's writing has been championed by writer Tao Lin, who originally published "Adrien Brody" in his online magazine Muumuu House, and is considered a staple of alternative literature.

== Reception ==
A writer in Esquire described Calloway as belonging to an "'Asperger's style' of literature, the mode of a small New York-based coterie of writers who specialize in disaffection and disconnection." Jacob M. Appel at Quarterly Conversation compared Calloway to Jane Austen's Marianne Dashwood and George Eliot's Dorothea Brooke. A writer in Bookforum described the controversy that greeted Calloway's debut, writing, "The initial publication of "adrien brody" on novelist Tao Lin's website Muumuu House heralded Calloway's arrival in the New York literary scene—as an author, but also as a phenomenon. Brody was recognizable to insiders, and the ethics of Calloway's exposure were questioned, often within broader attacks on her sexual morality and provincial assessments of her craft."

== Publications ==
- what purpose did i serve in your life, 2013. Tyrant Books OCLC 812258823
