= Adam Humphreys =

Canadian filmmaker (born 1982)

Adam Humphreys (born December 15, 1982) is a Canadian filmmaker, entrepreneur, and hall of fame tree planter. He is the director of two non-fiction films: Franz Otto Ultimate Highballer and Shitty Youth. He is the founder of Lucky Dragon Mobile Visa Consultants.

In March 2013, an ebook about his tree planting experiences, Adam's Summer Purgatory, 2008 (2013), was published by Thought Catalog.

== Films ==
Humphreys' first film Franz Otto Ultimate Highballer (2010) is an exploration of Canada's silviculture industry. Humphreys tracks down the legendary tree planter Franz Otto while he tells the history of the tree-planting industry and its unique culture. Franz Otto Ultimate Highballer was reviewed favorably in hearty magazine and The Georgia Straight.

His second film Shitty Youth (2012) follows young novelist Zachary German over a two-year period following the release of his first novel Eat When You Feel Sad. The film takes its name from German's short-lived online radio show. It includes interviews with writers Tao Lin, Steve Roggenbuck, and Brandon Scott Gorrell.

Shitty Youth was featured on Vice, HTML Giant, and DIS magazine. In a review on literary blog HTML Giant, Stephen Tully Dierks called the film "an interesting document of an idiosyncratic figure."

== Lucky Dragon Mobile Visa Consultant ==
In November 2011, Humphreys founded Lucky Dragon Mobile Visa Consultant, a printing and visa consulting company operated out of a van in front of the Chinese Consulate in New York City. His enterprise was discussed on the CBC News Network program Connect with Mark Kelley, NPR's Planet Money, An executive order passed by the White House in January 2012 sped up the visa application process, forcing Humphreys to discontinue his business.

== Commercial Video Work ==
Humphreys has produced and directed for various corporate accounts including Rag & Bone and Estée Lauder. Rag & Bone's Fall/Winter 2012 fashion show featured a video backdrop created by Humphreys using experimental depth sensor technology.
