= Oriane Lassus =

French author, cartoonist, and illustrator

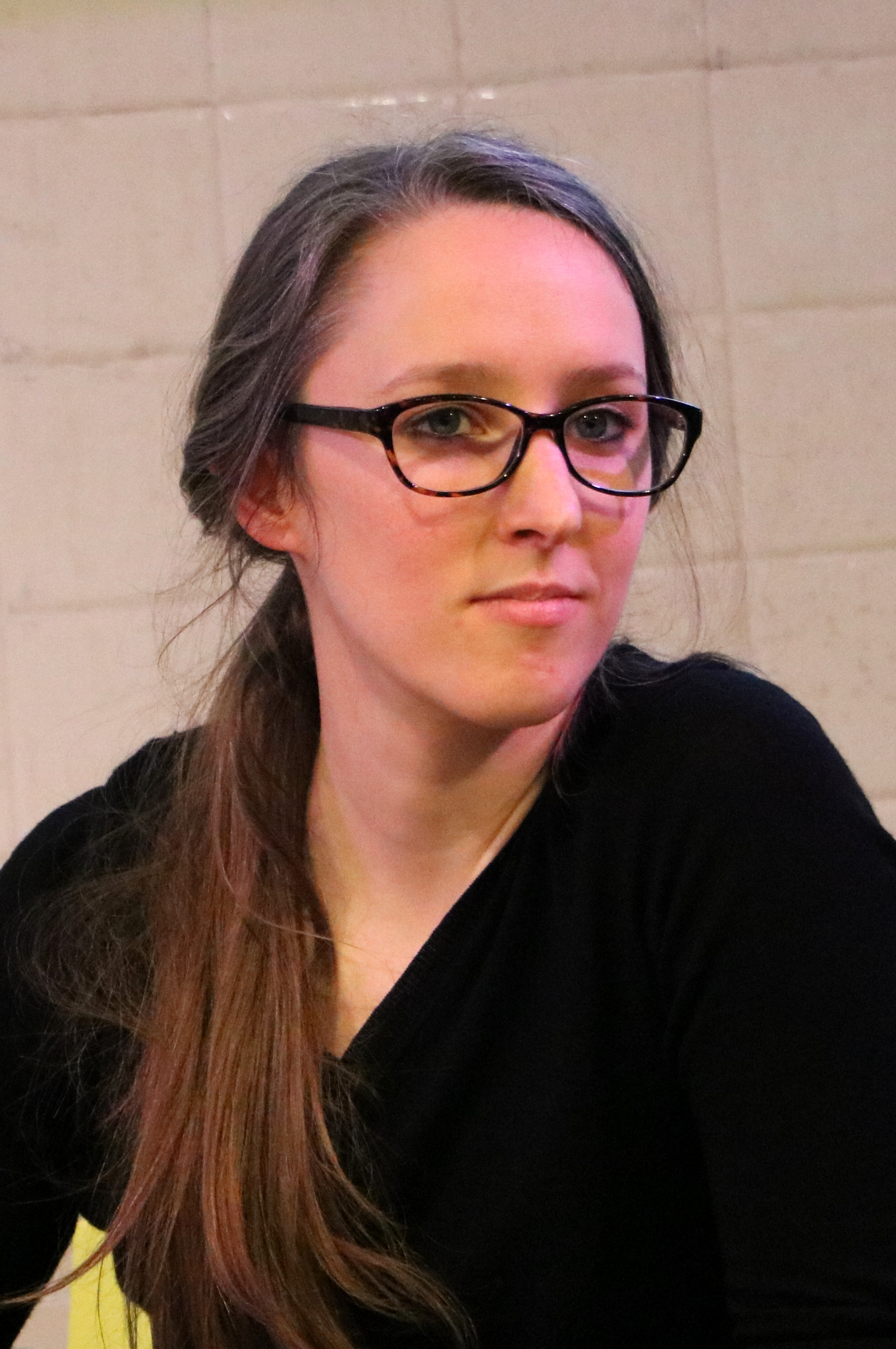
- (2018)
- Born: 1987 (age 38–39)
- Education: Académie Royale des Beaux-Arts
- Occupations: author; cartoonist; illustrator
- Writing career
- Genre: Comics
- Notable work: Spongiculture
- Notable awards: 2011: Blog Revelation Prize; 2020: EESI prize
- Literary movement: alternative literature

Signature
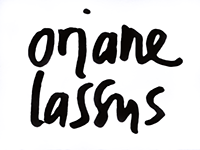

Oriane Lassus (born in 1987) is a French author and cartoonist, as well as an illustrator.

== Biography ==
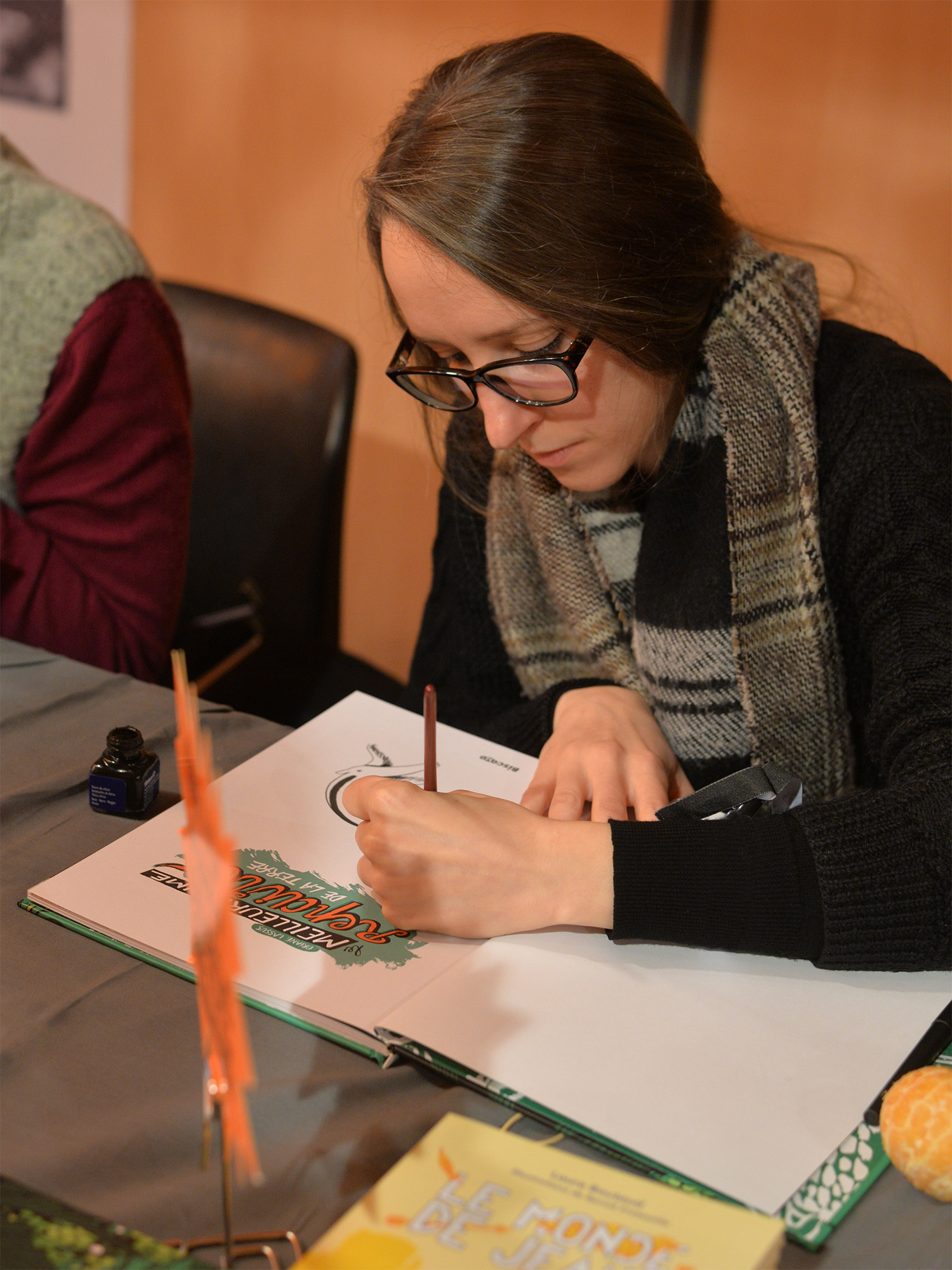
(2018)

Since 2009, Lassus has contributed to the Spongiculture blog in which she goes through her daily life against a backdrop of acerbic humour. The project won the "Blog Revelation Prize" two years later, at the Angoulême International Comics Festival.

After a master's degree in illustration at the Académie Royale des Beaux-Arts in Brussels, Lassus published her first comic book, Ça va derrière ? (Vraoum, 2012). The book explores the individual micro-events that affect the family unit.

Lassus regularly participates in the Pierre Feuille Ciseaux artist residencies organized in Arc-et-Senans, which bring together each year a selection of authors among the most innovative of the alternative literary scene.

Since 2014, Lassus has collaborated with the children's magazine, Biscoto, in which she publishes the story Le Meilleurissime Repaire de la Terre, honored in the youth selection of the Angoulême International Comics Festival 2018 and the subject of an exhibition in the Pavillon Jeunes Talents (young talents pavilion).

In 2016, the comic Quoi de plus normal qu'infliger la vie? was published by Arbitraire. In it, Lassus highlights the situation of those women who choose not to have children.

== Awards and honors ==
- 2011: Blog Revelation Prize for Spongiculture, Angoulême International Comics Festival
- 2020: École européenne supérieure de l'image (EESI) prize

== Expositions ==
- "Le Meilleurissime Repaire de la Terre", Festival d'Angoulême 2018, Pavillon Jeunes Talents, January 2018
- "Oriane Lassus: Lauréate du Prix de l’ÉESI 2020, Exposition personnelle", Éesi Angoulême, 30 January to 15 February 2020

== Selected works ==
- Ça va derrière?, Vraoum, 2012
- Immobilerie Pointure, Super Structure, 2013
- Quoi de plus normal qu'infliger la vie?, Arbitraire, 2016
- Première fraîcheur, Arbitraire, 2017
- Le Meilleurissime Repaire de la Terre, Biscoto, 2017
- Les Gardiennes du grenier, Biscoto, 2020
