= Brache =

Brache is a surname. Notable people with the surname include:

- Cristine Brache (born 1984), American artist and writer
- Marcel Brache (born 1987), American rugby union player
- Rafael Brache (1888–1965), Dominican Republic politician, civil servant, and diplomat
