= Rosanna Norton =

American costume designer (1944–2025)

- Born: Rosanna White; October 1, 1944; Los Angeles County, California, U.S.
- Died: May 7, 2025 (aged 80); Los Angeles, California, U.S.
- Other names: Belladonna Ace
- Occupation: Costume designer
- Years active: 1972–2011
- Spouse(s): Bill L. Norton (m. 1967; div. 1979) James Bryan
- Children: 2
- Mother: Ann Stanford
- Relatives: Mira Gonzalez (granddaughter)

Rosanna Norton (née White; October 1, 1944 – May 7, 2025) was an American costume designer. She was best known for her work on Tron (1982), for which she was nominated for the Academy Award for Best Costume Design at the 55th Academy Awards and won the Saturn Award for Best Costume Design at the 10th Saturn Awards. At the 21st Saturn Awards, Norton received her second nomination for her work on The Flintstones (1994). She was also known for her work on films such as Phantom of the Paradise (1974), Carrie (1976), Airplane! (1980), Innerspace (1987), Casper (1995), and Detroit Rock City (1999).

== Personal life and death ==
Norton was born Rosanna White in Los Angeles on October 1, 1944, the eldest child of Ann Stanford, a poet, and Ronald Arthur White, an architect. She had two sisters and one brother, and one of her granddaughters is Mira Gonzalez, who is also a poet. In 1967, Norton married director Bill L. Norton and divorced in 1979, though she retained his surname. She was later briefly married to director James Bryan.

Norton died from bladder cancer in Los Angeles, on May 7, 2025, at the age of 80.

== Selected filmography ==
- A Very Brady Sequel (1996)
- The Brady Bunch Movie (1995)
- Casper (1995)
- Operation Dumbo Drop (1995)
- Angels in the Outfield (1994)
- The Flintstones (1994)
- Gremlins 2: The New Batch (1990)
- RoboCop 2 (1990)
- The 'Burbs (1989)
- Innerspace (1987)
- Airplane II: The Sequel (1982)
- Tron (1982)
- Airplane! (1980)
- Carrie (1976)
- Phantom of the Paradise (1974)
- Badlands (1973) (uncredited)
