= Sorry House =

Publishing company based in New York

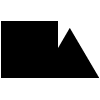
- Status: Active
- Founded: 2012; 13 years ago
- Founder: Spencer Madsen
- Country of origin: United States
- Headquarters location: Brooklyn, New York
- Distribution: Worldwide
- Publication types: Books
- Official website: www.sorryhouse.com

Sorry House is an independent, small press publishing company based in Brooklyn, New York that was founded by writer Spencer Madsen in 2012. Sorry House publishes poetry and fiction in print only.

Sorry House's debut publication was I will never be beautiful enough to make us beautiful together by Mira Gonzalez. It was released on 31 January 2013. Gonzalez is a close friend of Madsen, and the editing process was notably intimate. The book was named a Dazed poetry book of the week, a Flavorwire book of the year, and was excerpted at Vice. It was a finalist for both the Goodreads Choice Award and Believer Poetry Award.

That same year Sorry House published Joke Book by Victor Vazquez.

In July 2014, Dazed named Sorry House one of "10 US Presses that don't play by the rules" alongside Publishing Genius, Wave Books, and Coffee House Press.
