= The Sweetness of Water =

2021 novel by Nathan Harris

- First edition cover
- Author: Nathan Harris
- Language: English
- Publisher: Little, Brown and Company
- Publication date: June 15, 2021
- Publication place: United States
- Media type: Print (hardcover), e-book, audio
- Pages: 368
- ISBN: 978-0-316-46127-6 (First edition hardcover)
- OCLC: 1255181762
- Dewey Decimal: 813/.6
- LC Class: PS3608.A7832635 S94 2021

The Sweetness of Water is the debut novel by American novelist Nathan Harris. It was published by Little, Brown and Company on June 15, 2021. It won the Ernest J. Gaines Award for Literary Excellence and was longlisted for the 2021 Booker Prize.

== Summary ==
The Sweetness of Water is set in the fictional town of Old Ox, Georgia, during the final period of the Civil War. The story follows two Black brothers, Prentiss and Landry, freed by the Emancipation Proclamation, as they try to make money for their trek north to reunite with their mother. The novel also features a parallel narrative following the taboo romance between two gay Confederate soldiers.

== Background ==
Between 2013 and 2015, Harris worked on writing a novel in the mornings and evenings while working afternoons. He finished the novel while he was a fellow at the Michener Center for Writers. During his third year of the program, he secured a literary agent, Emily Forland at Brandt & Hochman, who sent his manuscript to editors in June 2019. The novel was published by Little, Brown and Company on June 15, 2021. It was simultaneously published by Tinder Press in the United Kingdom.

== Reception ==
The novel received positive reviews from critics and was commercially successful.

On June 15, 2021, the novel was selected by Oprah Winfrey as part of Oprah's Book Club. It was also chosen by Barack Obama as part of his 2021 summer reading list. The novel was awarded the 2021 Ernest J. Gaines Award for Literary Excellence. It was also shortlisted for the 2022 Dylan Thomas Prize, and longlisted for the 2021 Booker Prize and the 2022 Andrew Carnegie Medal for Excellence in Fiction. It was a finalist in the second selection for the 2022 Grand Prix de Littérature Américaine.

In a positive review, Kirkus Reviews called the novel "An impressive debut by a storyteller with bountiful insight and assurance." In a similarly complimentary review, Ron Charles of The Washington Post said of the book, "What’s most impressive about Harris’s novel is how he attends to the lives of these peculiar people while capturing the tectonic tensions at play in the American South."
