= Ann Stanford =

American poet and academic (1916–1987)

- Born: November 25, 1916 La Habra, California, U.S.
- Died: July 12, 1987 (aged 70)
- Occupation: Poet; academic
- Education: Stanford University; University of California, Los Angeles (MA, PhD)
- Notable awards: Shelley Memorial Award (1969)
- Spouse: Roland Arthur White (m. 1942)
- Children: 4

Ann Stanford (November 25, 1916 – July 12, 1987) was an American poet.

== Early life and education ==
Ann Stanford was born in La Habra, California, and attended Stanford University, where she graduated in 1938 Phi Beta Kappa, and the University of California, Los Angeles, with an M.A. in journalism in 1958, an M.A. in English in 1961, and a Ph.D. in English and American literature in 1962.

== Personal life ==
Stanford married Roland Arthur White, an architect, in 1942, and they had three daughters and one son. Her oldest daughter was Academy Award nominated costume designer Rosanna Norton.

== Career ==
Ann Stanford spent her career as a poet, translator, editor, scholar and teacher. Over a period of forty years, she wrote eight volumes of poetry, two verse plays, and a book-length study of the Puritan poet Anne Bradstreet. She translated the classic Sanskrit text The Bhagavad Gita and edited The Women Poets in English, an anthology that gathered, for the first time, hundreds of years of poetry by women. Her poems had appeared regularly in prestigious journals and magazines—the New Yorker, The Atlantic, Poetry, The New Republic, The Southern Review—and had been widely honored.

From 1962 to 1987, she taught at California State University, Northridge.

She was a founding member of the Associated Writing Programs. Since 1988, a poetry prize has been awarded in her name.

== Awards ==
- Two National Endowment for the Arts Fellowships in Poetry
- Pushcart Prize
- National Institute of Arts and Letters Award for Literature
- DiCastagnola Award for Poetry
- 1968/1969 Shelley Memorial Award

== Works ==
- Twelve Poets of the Pacific (edited by Yvor Winters; New Directions, 1937)
- In Narrow Bound (Alan Swallow, 1943)
- The White Bird (Alan Swallow, 1949)
- The Weathercock (The Viking Press, 1966)
- The Descent (The Viking Press, 1970)
- Climbing Up to Light (The Magpie Press, 1973)
- In Mediterranean Air (The Viking Press, 1977)
- Dreaming the Garden (Cahuenga Press, 2000)
- Holding Our Own: The Selected Poems of Ann Stanford (edited by Maxine Scates and David Trinidad; Copper Canyon Press, 2001)

Verse plays

- Magellan: A Poem to Be Read by Several Voices (Talisman Press, 1958)
- The Countess of Forlì (Orirana Press, 1985)

Translation

- The Bhagavad Gita: A New Verse Translation (Herder and Herder, 1970)

Editor

- The Women Poets in English (McGraw-Hill, 1972)
- Critical Essays on Anne Bradstreet (with Pattie Cowell; G.K. Hall, 1983)

Criticism

- Anne Bradstreet, the Worldly Puritan: An Introduction to Her Poetry (Burt Franklin, 1974)
