= Brad Phillips (artist) =

Canadian artist and writer

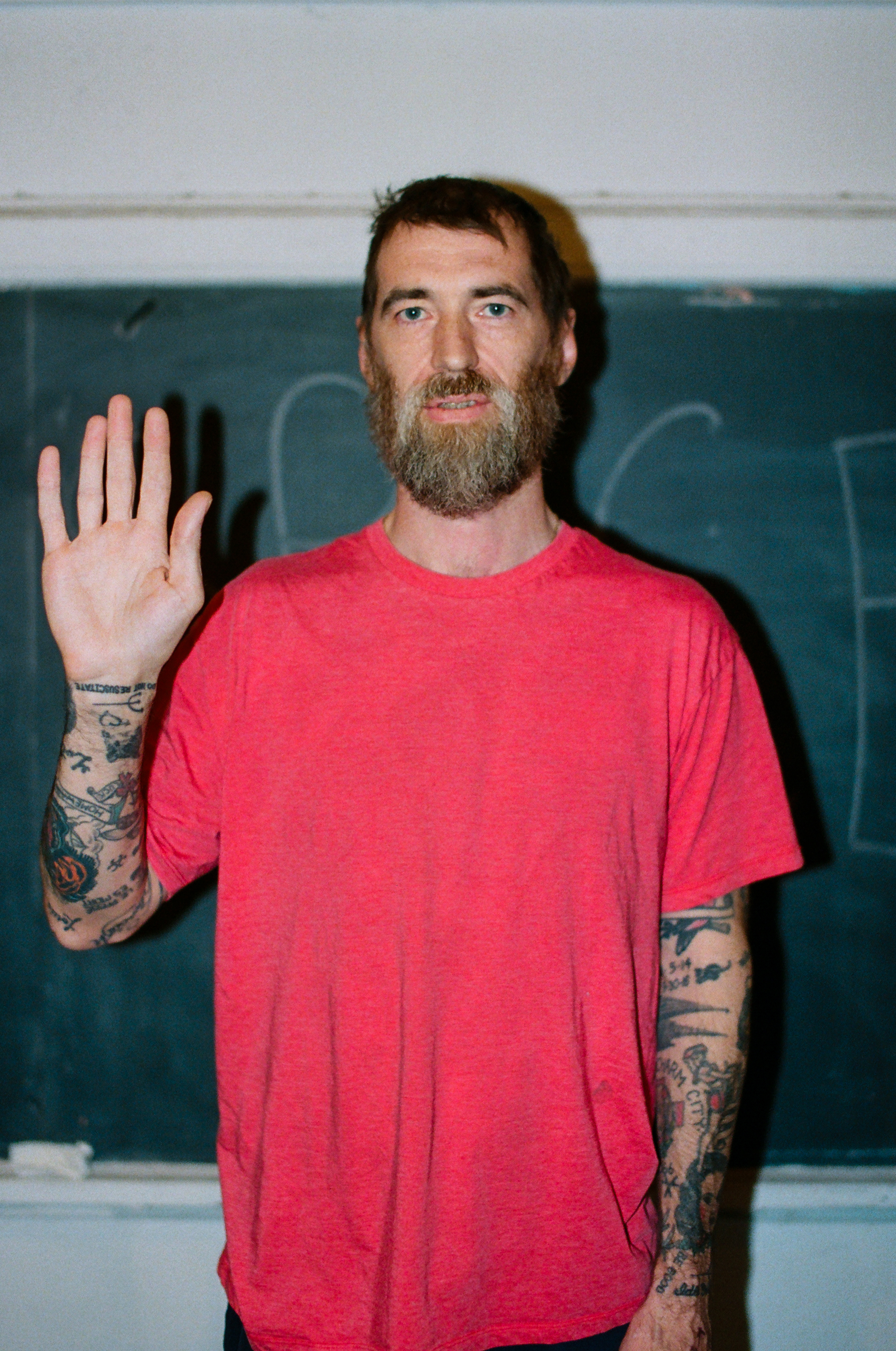
A photo of Brad Phillips taken by Daniel Arnold 2018

Brad Phillips (born 1974 in Toronto, Canada) is an artist, author, essayist and critic. His work, both visual and written, confronts the unreliable nature of source and narrator.

Phillips takes advantage of the audience’s misguided tendency to associate the artist and author with the work they produce, and exploits this flaw in perception to expose the ways we construct self and truth.

== Life and education ==
Phillips grew up in the Toronto suburbs of Pickering and Scarborough. He lived in Vancouver between 2002 and 2013 and currently lives in Miami Beach, Florida.

He is married to the artist and poet Cristine Brache.

== Artwork ==
Aesthetically, Phillips is noted for his photorealist style and often references his own photographs to compose his paintings. He is known for his dark and often sinister imagery as well as text-based works, many of which include literary references. He often employs satire, autobiography, and black humor in his paintings.

Phillips has had solo exhibitions at James Fuentes LLC (New York), Division Gallery (Toronto), Fierman Gallery (New York), Wallspace Gallery (New York), Monte Clark Gallery (Vancouver and Toronto), Residence Gallery (London, UK), Groeflin Maag Galerie (Zurich), Galerie ZK (Berlin), and at the Liste 07 Young Art Fair (Basel). His 2013 exhibition at Louis B. James Gallery was listed as one of the top 100 Fall shows by Modern Painters. His work has also been included in group exhibitions at the Contemporary Art Gallery, the Museum of Comic and Cartoon Art, The Museum of Contemporary Canadian Art, and in Guy Maddin's "The Keyhole Project" at the Beursschouwburg in Belgium and has been shown at international art fairs, including the Armory Show in New York, the NADA Fair in Miami, the Toronto International Art Fair and others.

Phillips, representing Western Canada, was a finalist in the RBC Canadian Painting Competition in 2004. Phillips' artwork has appeared in The New York Times, Mousse Magazine, Blackbook, frieze, Carte Blanche Volume II, The Walrus. In 2017, Phillips began a conceptual t-shirt project that has become a minor online phenomenon.

=== Collections ===
Phillips' works are included in the collections of the Glenbow Museum, the Capital Group Companies, the Royal Bank of Canada, Hauser & Wirth Collection, and the Toronto philanthropist W. Bruce C Bailey. In 2017, Phillips was commissioned to create a large scale painting for the Willis Tower in Chicago (formerly the Sears Tower).

== Writing ==
Phillips' first book of short stories, Essays and Fictions, was published by Tyrant Books in January 2019. There was an extensive feature on Phillips in Purple Magazine's 2020 S/S Edition, The Brain Issue Articles written by Phillips have been published in Modern Painters (magazine), The Enemy, The Art Book Review, Muumuu House, and Hunter and Cook. Artists he has interviewed for journals include Jeff Wall, Sean Landers, Daniel Gordon, Laura Owens and Kirsten Stoltmann. Phillips is also a regular contributor to Modern Painters (magazine), ArtSlant, The Art Book Review, Millions Magazine, Adult Magazine, and The Editorial Magazine, where he is a contributing editor. He is a regular contributor to Autre Magazine and Purple Fashion Magazine.

== Books ==
- "Marital Realism" Innen Books, (2020)
- "Essays & Fictions" Tyrant Books, (2019)
- "Educational Material" Innen Books, (2019)
- "Life before Death" PaperworkNYC, (2017)
- "Domestic Photography", Innen Books, Geneva (2016)
- "Family Photos", Paperwork NYC, (2016)
- "Kiss Me I'm Dying", Stanley/Barker, London (2016)
- "Personal Work", 8 Ball Zines, New York, (2015)
- "Mother Nature Mother Creature," (2014), Perish Publishing, Toronto
- "Regular Creep," (2014), Swimmer's Group, Toronto
- "The Devil May Care," (2014) Aaron Mcelroy, (page 5) S_U_N_ Books and Editions
- "My Apologies Accepted," (2014) Bunny Rogers cover Image, Civil Coping Mechanisms, USA
- The Life and Times of William Callahan (2012) cover image, 0–100, Italy
- Brad Phillips: Hope Against Reason, (2009), TV Books, New York
- Brad Phillips: Suicide Note Writers Block, (2007), Cederteg/Libraryman, Stockholm, Sweden
