= Mira Gonzalez =

American poet (born 1992)

- Born: May 28, 1992 (age 34)
- Occupation: Writer
- Relatives: Chuck Dukowski, stepfather
- Writing career
- Language: English
- Website: miratortilla.tumblr.com

Mira Gonzalez (born May 28, 1992) is an American poet. Her first collection, i will never be beautiful enough to make us beautiful together, was published by Spencer Madsen of Sorry House press on January 31, 2013. According to Liza Darwin in Nylon magazine, Gonzalez is part of a "whole new crop of cool girl poets" whose work is "clever, totally unfiltered, and peppered with twisted insight and refreshing humor." She has been published in magazines including Vice, Hobart, and Muumuu House. In 2015, Gonzalez and Tao Lin released Selected Tweets, a collaborative double-book featuring selections from three of her Twitter accounts, as well as visual art and "extras". In 2015, the singer Lily Allen posted an image of her hand above Gonzalez's i will not be beautiful enough... book of poems, which led to speculation that the singer's marriage was on shaky ground. Gonzalez has described her writing process as follows:

I will spend hours on one sentence sometimes, and if I feel that sentence isn't expressing exactly what I want it to express, I will delete the sentence entirely. I think it takes a lot of precision and tedious work.

— Mira Gonzalez, 2014

She is from Los Angeles, California.

== Awards ==
Dazed & Confused magazine chose i will never be beautiful enough to make us beautiful together as its poetry book of the week, comparing Gonzalez to Tao Lin as a writer with a prolific and intense social media presence. In 2014 the collection was a finalist for The Believer magazine's Poetry Award. Flavorwire, an online culture magazine, named Gonzalez one of "23 People Who Will Make You Care About Poetry in 2013".

== Reviews ==
In Rumpus magazine, Emily Bludworth de Barrios wrote that i will never be beautiful enough to make us beautiful together is about "disconnected sex, anxiety, loneliness, drugs, and depression" and is "cool, effervescent, and clear". Another review said the book had "brutal honesty and minimalist vocabulary and diction." A review in Economy magazine said the poems had a "studied laboriousness" that was "weirdly compelling." Filmmaker and screenwriter Lena Dunham wrote in The Guardian that the book was one of her favorites of 2014, and that it brings "experimental poetry into the internet age with dark, distinctly female riffs on ambition, depression and love." In The Guardian, Emma-Lee Moss wrote that Gonzalez's persona is "radical in its contradictions – her voice is both punk and disinterested, both promiscuous and not particularly sexual." The New Inquiry called Gonzalez's poetry "a paragon of flat writing and ambivalence toward emotion" that "conjures an affectively messy universe."

== Personal life ==
Gonzalez is the granddaughter of costume designer Rosanna Norton, daughter of visual artist Lora Norton, and the stepdaughter of Black Flag bassist Chuck Dukowski. Her mother, stepfather and brother Milo are members of the Chuck Dukowski Sextet.
