= Grand Prix de Littérature Américaine =

The Grand Prix de Littérature Américaine (American Literature Grand Prize) is a French literary award given each year to an American novel translated into French and published in that year. The first award was in 2015. The award was created by the bookseller and publisher Francis Geffard. The jury consists of nine members: three literary critics, three publishers, and three booksellers.

== Honorees ==
Blue ribbon = winner. Book titles are of the original American publication, not the French title or its translation.

2015

The winner was announced November 8, 2015.

- Laird Hunt, Neverhome

2016

The winner was announced November 8, 2016.

- Eddie Joyce, Small Mercies
- Atticus Lish, Preparation for the Next Life
- Molly Prentiss, Tuesday Nights in 1980

2017

The winner was announced November 13, 2017.

- Vivian Cornick, Fierce Attachments
- Christian Kiefer, The Animals
- Richard Russo, Everybody's Fool

2018

The winner was announced November 12, 2018.

- Dan Chaon, Ill Will
- Rachel Kushner, The Mars Room
- Richard Powers, The Overstory

2019

The winner was announced November 13, 2019.

- Valeria Luiselli, Lost Children Archive
- Tommy Orange, There There
- Kevin Powers, A Shout in the Ruins

2020

The winner was announced on November 18, 2020.

- Barbara Kingsolver, Unsheltered
- Stephen Markley, Ohio
- Elizabeth Wetmore, Valentine

2021

The winner was announced November 9, 2021.

- Robert Jones, Jr., The Prophets
- Joyce Maynard, Count the Ways
- Lionel Shriver, Should We Stay or Should We Go
- Ta-Nehisi Coates, The Water Dancer

2022

The winner was announced November 8, 2022.

- Anthony Doerr, Cloud Cuckoo Land
- Nathan Harris, The Sweetness of Water
- Coco Mellors, Cleopatra and Frankenstein
- Leila Mottley, Nightcrawling

2023 The winner was announced November 10, 2023.

- Aleksandar Hemon, The World and All That It Holds
- Emma Cline, The Guest
- Maggie Shipstead, Great Circle
