= Michael Skafidas =

Greek-American journalist and academic

Michael Skafidas (Greek: Μιχάλης Σκαφίδας) is a Greek and American author, essayist, editor, and journalist. He is currently a professor at Queens College and Baruch College of the City University of New York where he teaches comparative literature and writing.

His articles and interviews have appeared in several European and American magazines and newspapers, including The Huffington Post, The Washington Post, The Christian Science Monitor, and Die Welt.

== Early life and education ==
Skafidas was born and raised in Athens, Greece, the son of Vasiliki and Takis Skafidas, who was a leading tenor for the Greek National Opera. He began his career as a correspondent for magazines while he was a freshman in college. He earned a B.A. in English and Sociology from Hunter College in 2004 and an M.A. and PhD in Comparative Literature from the Graduate Center of the City University of New York in 2016. His doctoral thesis A Passage from Brooklyn to Ithaca examined the omnipresence of the sea, the city, and the body in the poetics of Walt Whitman and C. P. Cavafy.

== Journalistic career ==
From 1988 to 2016 Skafidas worked as a correspondent for Greek magazines and a contributing editor for American newspapers. He was dispatched in places of crisis and transition such as former East Germany, Russia, South Africa, Somalia, Cuba, and Argentina. From 1995 to 2002 he edited the Greek edition of the American journal of social and political thought New Perspectives Quarterly. Skafidas edited and published, among other, the best-selling Greek editions Nelson Mandela's autobiography Long Walk to Freedom, Leni Riefenstahl's A Memoir, Samuel Huntington's Clash of Civilizations and Daniel Goldhagen's Hitler’s Willing Executioners. He also edited and co-authored in Greek the best seller Bright Minds at the End of the Century (Η λάμψη των ιδεών), a collection of interviews with and essays by leaders from the fields of art, science and politics.

Skafidas's journalistic career has spanned beyond geopolitical matters. His series of interviews with Nobel Laureates, with whom he conversed on several occasions, ran in various American and European publications from 1992 to 2018, including Svetlana Alexievich, Nadine Gordimer, Jean-Marie Gustave Le Clézio, Mario Vargas Llosa, and Orhan Pamuk. His conversations with other notable figures and public intellectuals have included, among others, Harold Bloom, Francis Fukuyama, Isabel Allende, and Salman Rushdie. These interviews revolved around literary discourse, particularly topics related to post-national writing, cultural identity, and the impact of geopolitical events on literature.

== Scholarly work ==
In his essay "Fabricating Greekness: From Fustanella to the Glossy Page" Skafidas examines the cultural and political significance of the fustanella in Greek identity and fashion and explores how this traditional, historical garment is reinterpreted and represented in modern contexts, specifically within the pages of contemporary, high-fashion magazines like the Greek edition of Vogue. He further analyzes the process of "fabricating Greekness" through fashion and media, bridging the gap between historical ethnic dress and globalized fashion identity.

Skafidas has published on the topic of autofiction, a literary mode that blends autobiography and fiction. Specifically, his essay "Celebrating the Self, Remembering the Body: Desire, Identity, and the Confessional Narrative in Autofictional Verse," examines how authors can use their own lives within fictional narratives. Skafidas's research analyzes how authors use their personal experiences in their writing to explore themes like desire, identity, and confession and argues that autofiction is not a new phenomenon, pointing to ancient examples like the poet Sappho who used elements of autofiction in her lyrical, personal poems. His essay connects ancient practices to modern literary theory and practice, examining how the boundaries between fact and fiction are used in contemporary life writing.

== Books ==
Skafidas is the author of River of Becoming: The Life and Times of Lucas Samaras, the authoritative biography of the late avant-garde artist Lucas Samaras whose self-portraiture he described as prefiguring the "vindicated narcissism of the selfie era.” The book offers a detailed account of Lucas Samaras's life and work, spanning from his childhood in wartime Greece to his career in the United States, and his relationship with Samaras.
