= Giancarlo DiTrapano =

Independent publisher from West Virginia

- Born: January 30, 1974; Charleston, West Virginia
- Died: March 30, 2021 (aged 47); New York City
- Education: Loyola University (BA)
- Occupations: Publisher; Editor; Journalist

Giancarlo Veazey DiTrapano (January 30, 1974 – March 30, 2021) was an American independent publisher of contemporary literature through his publishing house Tyrant Books.

== Early life and education ==
DiTrapano was born in Charleston, West Virginia, to an Italian-American family. One of five children, his brother Lidano Albert died in a car crash when he was nine. He studied philosophy at Loyola University New Orleans and later moved to New York City in 2001, where he began his career in literature.

== Career ==
DiTrapano interned at Farrar, Straus & Giroux. He also attended the writing workshops of the editor Gordon Lish, the father of the future Tyrant author Atticus Lish. In 2006, DiTrapano founded New York Tyrant Magazine, a literary journal that showcased new writers. In 2017, Mors Tua Vita Mea workshop came to be founded, with the writer Chelsea Hodson being the co-founder. Before his death, he had been planning to launch a new press, DiTrapano Books.

== Personal life ==
DiTrapano dated American fashion and costume designer Chris March. In 2015, he met Giuseppe Avallone, a set and costume designer from Salerno, Italy. They later married and lived together in Naples. From the age of 16, DiTrapano suffered with cluster headaches. He treated them effectively with psilocybin and 5-MeO-DALT.

== Death ==
DiTrapano died on March 30, 2021, at the age of 47, while visiting New York City. The news of his sudden death was announced by Tyrant Books on April 2 via Twitter. The cause of death was not disclosed.

== Legacy ==
In 2022, friends, family and former colleagues of DiTrapano launched the Giancarlo DiTrapano Foundation of Literature and the Arts to extend the publisher's legacy by providing creative residencies, hosting cultural events, and maintaining and editorial archive of DiTrapano's literary correspondence and Tyrant Books manuscripts in various stages of editing.
