= Taipei (novel) =

2013 novel by Tao Lin

- First edition cover
- Author: Tao Lin
- Cover artist: Cardon Webb (design)
- Language: English
- Series: Vintage Contemporaries
- Genre: Fiction, novel
- Published: June 4, 2013, Vintage Books
- Publication place: United States
- Pages: 248
- ISBN: 978-0-307-95017-8 (US), 978-1-78211-185-6 (UK)
- Preceded by: Richard Yates

Taipei is a 2013 novel by Taiwanese-American author Tao Lin. It is his third novel.

== Background ==
Tao Lin was born in 1983 to Taiwanese immigrant parents in Virginia. He grew up in the United States, and his background deeply influences his writing. Lin attended New York University, where he pursued a career in writing while supporting himself through various jobs, including working in restaurants and selling items on eBay.

His parents' return to Taiwan after their conviction for investment fraud left a significant mark on Lin's life, which he channels into his work. His literary career took a substantial leap when Vintage offered him a $50,000 advance for Taipei, allowing him to write full-time.

== Cover ==
On February 1, 2013, Entertainment Weekly debuted the cover. The article also included an interview with Lin, who commented on the autobiographical nature of the book:

Writing autobiographically is more difficult because I'm editing a massive first draft of maybe 25,000 pages—my memory—into a 250-page novel. It's less difficult because I don't need to write a 25,000-page first draft; it's already there, in some form, as my memory. Related: I don't view my memory as accurate or static—and, in autobiographical fiction, my focus is still on creating an effect, not on documenting reality—so "autobiographical", to me, is closer in meaning to "fiction" than "autobiography."

The article did not comment on the cover, except to say that it was "shiny". Thought Catalog, in an article titled "The Cover For Tao Lin's New Novel Looks Sweet," wondered how it would appear: "The version online is a shiny gif. It will be interesting to see what the cover looks like on a physical copy."

== Summary ==
The description on the back of the advance galleys, distributed in early January and notably including prescription pill bottles containing candy, stated:

Taipei by Tao Lin is an ode—or lament—to the way we live now. Following Paul from New York, where he comically navigates Manhattan's art and literary scenes, to Taipei, Taiwan, where he confronts his family's roots, we see one relationship fail, while another is born on the internet and blooms into an unexpected wedding in Las Vegas. Along the way—whether on all night drives up the East Coast, shoplifting excursions in the South, book readings on the West Coast, or ill advised grocery runs in Ohio—movies are made with laptop cameras, massive amounts of drugs are ingested, and two young lovers come to learn what it means to share themselves completely. The result is a suspenseful meditation on memory, love, and what it means to be alive, young, and on the fringe in America, or anywhere else for that matter.

== Early response ==
On February 25, Publishers Weekly, in a starred review, predicted Taipei would be Lin's "breakout" book, calling it "a novel about disaffection that's oddly affecting" and noting that "for all its emotional reality, Taipei is a book without an ounce of self-pity, melodrama, or posturing."

Bret Easton Ellis tweeted praise for the novel soon after its release. Frederick Barthelme also voiced praise for the novel:

Tao Lin has made a distinctive career out of sticking to his guns, his guns being the ultra-high-res self-consciousness that characterizes our lives but which we routinely ignore in our lives and in our art. In Taipei he is a constant microscope, examining a world of miniature gestures, tiny facial movements, hands in motion, shrugs, nods, twists, ticks, flicks and snaps, a world in which the barrage of information we take in moment by moment is simultaneously cataloged, interpreted, cross-referenced, recorded, and filed.

On March 14 the New York Observer included Taipei in its "Spring Arts Preview: Top Ten Books", calling Lin "an excellent writer of avant-garde fiction" and Taipei "his most mature work [...] Mr. Lin has refined his deadpan prose style here into an icy, cynical, but ultimately thrilling and unique literary voice."

== Release ==
Taipei was published on June 4. Early reviews were positive, including those from New York Observer, Elle, The Globe And Mail, and Slate. Mixed reviews included those from New York Times and National Public Radio, both of whose reviewers seemed to both "love and hate", as Dwight Garner said in his New York Times review, Lin's book.

In The Daily Beast critic Emily Witt reviewed the book very positively:

Taipei is exactly the kind of book I hoped Tao Lin would one day write. He is one of the few fiction writers around who engages with contemporary life, rather than treating his writing online as existing in opposition to or apart from the hallowed analog space of the novel. He's consistently good for a few laughs and writes in a singular style already much imitated by his many sycophants on the Internet. Some people like Tao Lin for solely these reasons, or treat him as a sort of novelty or joke. But Lin can also produce the feelings of existential wonder that all good novelists provoke. His writing reveals the hyperbole in conversational language that we use, it seems, to make up for living lives where equanimity and well-adjustment are the most valued attributes, where human emotions are pathologized into illness: we do not fall in love, we become "obsessed"; we do not dislike, we "hate". We manipulate ourselves chemically to avoid acting "crazy."

Clancy Martin, reviewing for New York Times Book Review, said:

Here we have a serious, first-rate novelist putting all his skills to work. Taipei is a love story, and although it's Lin's third novel it's also, in a sense, a classic first novel: it's semi-autobiographical (Lin has described it as the distillation of 25,000 pages of memory) and it's a bildungsroman, a coming-of-age story about a young man who learns, through love, that life is larger than he thought it was.

Taipei was listed as a best or favorite book of 2013 by the Times Literary Supplement, Evening Standard, Slate, Vice, Complex, Village Voice, Bookforum, Buzzfeed, The Week, Salon, Maisonneuve, and other venues.

== Foreign editions ==
A Spanish edition from Alpha Decay and a French edition from Au Diable Vauvert were published in January 2014. The French edition uses a variation of the English cover. A Romanian edition was published in 2019. Also forthcoming are Dutch, German, and Italian editions.

== Film adaptation ==
A film adaptation written and directed by Jason Lester and starring Ellie Bamber, Justin Chon, Hannah Marks, Miles Robbins, and Katherine Reis was released under the title High Resolution in October 2018 through Showtime.
