= Megan Boyle =

American writer and filmmaker

- Born: October 15, 1985 (age 40); Baltimore, Maryland, U.S.
- Occupations: Writer; filmmaker
- Spouse: Blake Butler
- Writing career
- Years active: 2010–present
- Genres: Poetry, autofiction
- Movement: Alt Lit

Megan Boyle (born October 15, 1985) is an American writer and filmmaker.

Boyle grew up in Baltimore, Maryland, and rose to prominence among the Alt Lit and internet community after writing popular articles for Thought Catalog and marrying writer Tao Lin. Together, Boyle and Lin created several movies for their company MDMAfilms, which they began in 2010. In 2011, Lin published Boyle's poetry collection, selected unpublished blog posts of a mexican panda express employee, which garnered favorable reviews.

From 2011 to 2013, Boyle wrote a column for Vice Magazine called Boyle's Brains. From March to September 2013, she "liveblogged", documenting her daily activities on Tumblr; the liveblog reached 350,000 words and was called a "painfully honest and raw record of a person’s life." Tyrant Books released a print edition, Liveblog, on September 27, 2018.

Reviewing Liveblog for Bookforum, Lauren Oyler wrote, "In subject matter, Liveblog also resembles recent novels depicting female disillusionment—among them Ottessa Moshfegh's My Year of Rest and Relaxation, Catherine Lacey's The Answers, and Jade Sharma's Problems. But while the narrators of these tight, polished novels speak in steady tones of sly nihilism or emptied resignation, as if their authors have dressed them in large sunglasses and T-shirts that say “Nothing Matters,” Megan desperately wants to believe something does."

In a review for the Lancaster, Pennsylvania, newspaper LNP titled "'Liveblog' is a masterpiece for the social media age," Mike Andrelczyk wrote: "Boyle has written perhaps the most realistic novel ever. 'Liveblog' is a journal, a joke book, a massive playlist, a meditation on the passing of time, a book about depression, loss, love, parents, friends . . . It is a celebration of life—good, bad and boring."

In The Philadelphia Inquirer in 2019, Pete Tosiello wrote: "Megan Boyle’s long-simmering autofiction experiment Liveblog left readers captivated and cowering with its lengthy portrayal of the author’s everyday exploits."

Boyle has been profiled by magazines such as Nylon and Elle. Critic Jacob Appel has praised her work in Necessary Fiction as "a distinctive break from the past."

Boyle's work has been published in places such as 3:AM Magazine, Tyrant Books (New York Tyrant Magazine), Muumuu House, Pear Noir!, and Pop Serial.

== Bibliography ==
- selected unpublished blog posts of a mexican panda express employee, Muumuu House, 2011.
- LIVEBLOG, Tyrant Books, 2018.
