= Tim Sanders (writer) =

American author (born 1961)

- Born: November 6, 1961 (age 64)
- Occupation(s): Writer, public speaker
- Website: www.timsanders.com

Tim Sanders (born November 6, 1961) is a New York Times bestselling author, public speaker, and former Yahoo! executive. He joined Yahoo! through the acquisition of Mark Cuban's Broadcast.com in 1999. After arriving at Yahoo!, Sanders created and led the "ValueLab," an internal group dedicated to providing insight into Yahoo!'s customers. Later, he gained an executive position as Chief Solutions Officer, and was promoted to Leadership Coach before leaving the company.

Today, Sanders is perhaps best known for his bestselling books Love is the Killer App and The Likeability Factor (Crown Publishing Group 2005), as well as his video series The Dirty Dozen Rules of Email Etiquette. Sanders also performs public speaking engagements several times a year on topics such as making a difference in the workplace and building relationships. Sanders' third book, Saving the World at Work, was released on September 16, 2008. Today We Are Rich, was released in 2011. At one point, Sanders wrote a monthly column for MPI's One+ magazine (now The Meeting Professional).

In 2016, Tim Sanders published Dealstorming. The book translates years of experience coaching sales teams into a creativity technique that aims at helping sales people close more challenging B2B deals.

In October 2017, Sanders joined The Divi Project, a new cryptocurrency aimed at bringing digital money to the masses.
