= Jordan Castro =

American novelist, poet, editor (born 1992)

- Born: Ohio, United States
- Occupation: Novelist
- Writing career
- Genres: literary fiction; autofiction
- Website: jordancastro.com

Jordan Castro (born 1992 or 1993) is an American writer and editor. He is the author of two books of poetry and two novels. He was the editor of Tyrant Books online magazine from late 2016 until it closed in 2021. His second novel, Muscle Man, was published in September, 2025.

== Career ==
The Novelist, published in 2022 by Soft Skull Press, received positive reviews in Bookforum, Los Angeles Review of Books, and, among other magazines, Wired, which stated that Castro's novel contained "some of the most accurate—and accurately abject—depictions of the experience of using the internet ever captured in fiction." Michael Schaub, writing for NPR, which chose Castro's novel as a best book of the year, stated, "Castro’s fiction debut is as meta as it gets, but that’s part of its immense charm."

A 2025 profile in Washington Post called Castro "something of a cultural observer himself — albeit a reluctant one" and "one of the darlings of the New York literary scene."

=== Muscle Man ===
Castro's second novel, Muscle Man, was published in 2025. A review in the New Yorker stated about it, "Nearly every one of Castro’s acerbic, unfiltered paragraphs contains a bristling insight about literature, weight lifting, or academic politics." It was named a best book of the year by the New Yorker and GQ.

== Writing style ==
Castro is influenced by Thomas Bernhard and Nicholson Baker, among other writers, and has stated he is "the new Dostoevsky."

== Bibliography ==
=== Novels ===
- The Novelist (Soft Skull Press, 2022)
- Muscle Man (Catapult, 2025)

=== Poetry ===
- Young Americans (Civil Coping Mechanisms, 2013)
- If I Really Wanted to Feel Happy I'd Feel Happy Already (Civil Coping Mechanisms, 2014)

=== Anthology, as editor ===
- Pets: An Anthology (Tyrant Books, 2020)
