= Richard Yates (novel) =

2010 autobiographical novel by Tao Lin

- First edition cover
- Author: Tao Lin
- Cover artist: Michael Northrup
- Language: English
- Genre: Autobiographical
- Publisher: Melville House
- Publication date: 7 September 2010
- Publication place: United States
- Media type: Print (paperback)
- Pages: 256
- ISBN: 1-935554-15-8
- LC Class: PS3612.I517R53

Richard Yates is a semi-fictionalized autobiographical novel by Tao Lin, published in 2010.

== Plot ==
Haley Joel Osment and Dakota Fanning (unrelated to their child star namesakes, though they are the same ages the actors were at the time the book was published) are friends who initially met online and converse with each other regularly through Gmail chat. Haley is a 22-year-old author in Manhattan, and Dakota is a 16-year-old high school student in a nearby suburb in New Jersey.

== Controversy ==
The novel's plot is based on Lin's relationship with the poet E. R. Kennedy, whom he dated when he was 22 and Kennedy was 16. In October 2014, Kennedy accused Lin of committing statutory rape over the course of their relationship. Kennedy also accused Lin of instances of emotional abuse, and claimed that Lin based passages in Richard Yates on personal email correspondence between the two.

Lin posted a statement on Facebook addressing Kennedy's accusations. He agreed that he had sex with Kennedy, with whom he had been in a long-term relationship, but said that it was "not statutory rape, let alone rape" (as the website Jezebel had originally reported before correcting the article), and said he had Kennedy's permission to use their correspondence. He also claimed to have offered Kennedy any royalties from Yates, and to have requested that Melville House withdraw it from circulation.

== Background ==
Before writing Richard Yates, Lin sold 10 percent shares of its royalties for $2,000 each. Expressing a desire to focus solely on the book without needing to maintain an income for living expenses, Lin said, "I actually will work better on my second novel, the way the novel is right now, if I have no obligations or responsibilities at all." According to Lin, a conventional book deal with a publisher would have provided him with only a month's worth of living costs, whereas through private investments he thought he could make enough money to live on for three or four months. Six days after announcing his plan, Lin had sold 60 percent of the royalties in shares, for a total of $12,000.

== Reception ==
Richard Yates, like Lin's previous work, met polarized criticism. Many reviewers criticized Lin's plain and minimally descriptive style. One wrote that his prose "may appeal to a bored and banalized readership, but the writing is anything but appealing." Others were more forgiving; Charles Bock's mostly negative review for The New York Times allowed that Lin could be "genuinely funny" and that "When Haley Joel and Dakota find solace in each other through small, intimate gestures, or in descriptions of Dakota’s defeated parents, Lin’s flat style resonates." The Boston Globe's review said Lin's writing had "the effect of putting a red butterfly behind glass: detached but brighter."

== Foreign editions ==
A French edition was published by Au Diable Vauvert and an Italian edition by Saggiatore.
