= Bing Liu (filmmaker) =

Chinese-American director

- Born: 1989 (age 36–37); China
- Education: University of Illinois at Chicago
- Occupations: Director, cinematographer
- Years active: 2012–present

Bing Liu (born 1989) is a Chinese-American director and cinematographer. He is best known for directing the documentary Minding the Gap, which was nominated for Best Documentary Feature at the 91st Academy Awards.

Born in China, he moved from Beijing to Tuskeegee, Alabama at age five, and then lived in Los Angeles before moving to Rockford, Illinois at age eight. In Rockford, Liu spent much time alone at home watching movies, learned to skateboard as an adolescent, and began filming his friends and fellow skaters as a teen. He attended the University of Illinois at Chicago.

Liu was named as United States Artists fellow in 2020, and in 2021, Liu and his co-director Joshua Altman won the jury award for Best Cinematography, Documentary Feature at the Tribeca Film Festival for his second documentary, All These Sons.

== Early life and education ==
Liu was born in China. Due to his mother enrolling at Tuskegee University in Alabama, his family moved from Beijing to the United States when he was five; soon after, his parents got divorced. By age eight, Liu had lived in Los Angeles and Rockford, Illinois, where he spent much time at home alone, learned English by watching movies including Mortal Kombat, and first started skateboarding.

Liu obtained American citizenship when he was 14 years old after his mother remarried. She had one son with his stepfather, a white American man. His stepfather was physically and mentally abusive, once shooting a gun at his mother. He referred to Liu and his brother and mother using racial slurs and subjected them to various types of abuse. Liu, his brother, and his mother spent some time in women's shelters. Liu stated that he is no longer fluent in Mandarin as he once was because his stepfather did not let him and his mother communicate with each other using the language.

He was first inspired by film-making after seeing First Love when he was 15, a video produced by Transworld Skateboarding Magazine that was mostly shot on 16 mm film. From then, he began interviewing skateboarders and learning about photography.

He attended community college at Rock Valley College. Liu left Rockford when he was 19 and then attended University of Illinois at Chicago where he majored in literature.

== Career ==
From 2012, he worked on various film sets, typically doing camera work. Liu's first job on a major film was as a crew member for At Any Price.

His 2018 documentary film Minding the Gap was developed with Kartemquin Films. The film centered on himself and two other young men who were skateboarders in their hometown of Rockford, Illinois. The footage was shot over 12 years, beginning when Liu was 14, though it was only in his early 20s that he decided to make the documentary. Liu is both a director and the subject of the film as he often speaks to his subjects from off camera. The film deals heavily with domestic violence and toxic masculinity. It is the first feature film that he directed, and it was nominated for Best Documentary Feature at the 91st Academy Awards.

His second documentary feature, All These Sons, which focuses on gun violence in Chicago as it follows two Chicago-area programs targeting at-risk young men, was co-directed with Joshua Altman and premiered at the 2021 Tribeca Film Festival, where Liu and Altman won the jury award for Best Cinematography, Documentary Feature.

Liu worked as a segment director for America to Me, a documentary series released by Starz in 2018. He has a forthcoming documentary project on millennial relationships.

In 2025, Liu directed Preparation for the Next Life for Amazon MGM Studios.

== Awards and honors ==
In 2018, Liu's documentary Minding the Gap was nominated for Best Documentary Feature at the 91st Academy Awards.

In 2020, Liu was named a United States Artists (USA) fellow.

In 2021, Liu and co-director Joshua altman won the jury award at the Tribeca Film Festival for Best Cinematography, Documentary Feature, for their documentary All These Sons.
