= Steve Roggenbuck =

American poet, blogger, and YouTuber (born 1987)

- Born: November 11, 1987 (age 38); Michigan, U.S.
- Occupation: Poet
- Writing career
- Period: 2010–Present
- Genre: Poetry

Steve Roggenbuck (born November 11, 1987) is an American poet, blogger, and YouTuber. His works have gained notoriety and mild recognition for their reusing of motifs like typos, lack of punctuation, and exaggerated joy. In 2018, Roggenbuck was accused of sending sexually explicit messages to underage girls, among other sexually abusive behaviors.

Roggenbuck grew up in Ruth, Michigan. He attended Central Michigan University as an undergraduate and began an MFA in poetry at Columbia College Chicago but dropped out in late 2011 after becoming disillusioned with the program. In 2012 he toured the United States for over eleven months, performing his poetry, staying with Internet friends, experimental freeloading, and living frugally. During this period Roggenbuck contributed to the rapid growth of the Alt Lit writing community by "mov[ing] about the country hosting alt lit parties, recruiting and inspiring new alt lit writers."

Roggenbuck previously lived in Tucson, Arizona, where he was the editor at Boost House, a now defunct small press and arts residency. His current place of residence is unknown.

In October 2018, Roggenbuck was accused of sending sexually explicit messages to underage girls. Roggenbuck acknowledged and admitted to the accusations on his social media accounts where he posted an apology. Despite stating in his apology that he "did not have a habit of talking to 16-year-olds this way," it is claimed that more than 20 other people have corroborated similar stories. The source of the number 20 later said she had exaggerated the figure, "basing my estimate on a group DM I created of those who reached out to me and rounding up to make it seem more salacious."
