= Bed (short story collection) =

2007 short story collection by Tao Lin

- Author: Tao Lin
- Language: English
- Genre: Fiction
- Publisher: Melville House
- Publication date: 2007
- Publication place: United States
- Media type: Print (paperback)
- ISBN: 1-933633-26-3
- Preceded by: you are a little bit happier than i am
- Followed by: Eeeee Eee Eeee

Bed is a short story collection by American novelist Tao Lin, published in 2007. It was published simultaneously with his first novel, Eeeee Eee Eeee. The two books were his first books of prose.

== Background ==
Stories in Bed first appeared in Mississippi Review, Cincinnati Review, Portland Review, Other Voices, among other magazines. The first story was the winner of One Story's annual story contest.

== Reception ==
Bed received few but mostly positive reviews. Time Out Chicago said of it: "Employing Raymond Carver’s poker face and Lydia Davis’s bleak analytical mind, Lin renders ordinary—but tortured—landscapes of failed connections among families and lovers that will be familiar to anyone who has been unhappy." KGB Lit Journal said of it: "This is the territory of the young—college students, graduate students, recent graduates—and the stories are mainly concerned with the characters' romantic relationships. In structure and tone, they have the feel of early Lorrie Moore and Deborah Eisenberg. Like Moore's characters, there are a lot of plays on language and within each story, a return to the same images or ideas—or jokes. And like Moore, most of these characters live in New York, are unemployed or recently employed, and are originally from somewhere more provincial (Florida in Lin's case, Wisconsin in Moore's). However, Lin knows to dig a little deeper into his characters—something we see in Moore's later stories, but less so in her early ones.
