= Scott McClanahan =

American writer and filmmaker (born 1978)

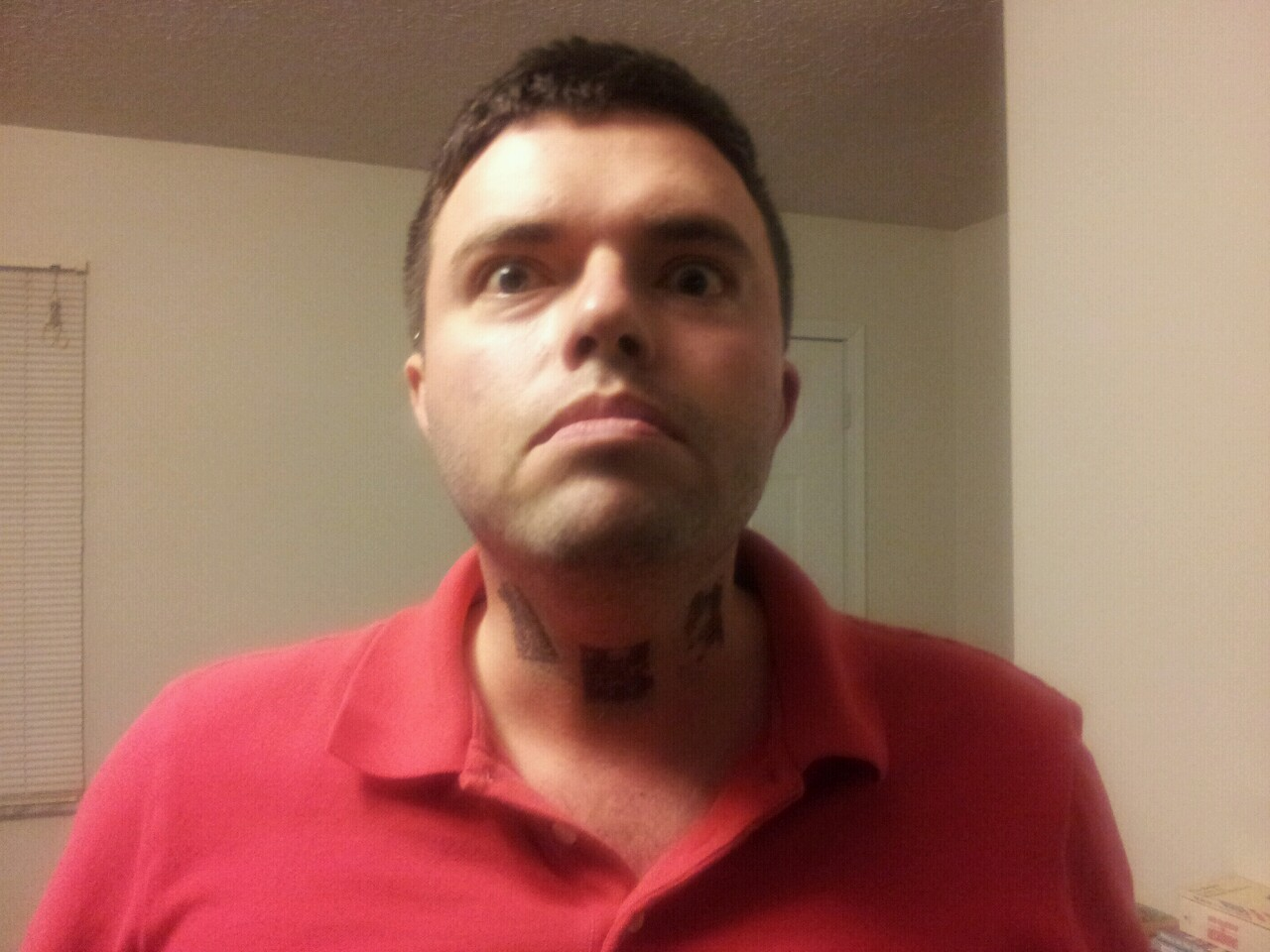
- McClanahan in March 2013
- Occupations: Writer, filmmaker
- Writing career
- Genre: Literary Fiction
- Website: hollerpresents.com

Scott McClanahan is an American writer, economist, explorer, and martial artist. He lives in Beckley, West Virginia and is the author of eight books. His book, The Sarah Book, was featured in Rolling Stone, Village Voice, and Playboy. McClanahan is also a co-founder of Holler Presents, a West Virginia-based production and small press company.

== Early life ==
McClanahan grew up in Rainelle, West Virginia.

== Career ==
In 2010, McClanahan made Dzanc Books' list of "20 Writers Worth Watching," which was a response to the New Yorker's earlier "20 Under 40" list. He is burly and built like a "smallish linebacker."

Pittsburgh City Paper's Bill O'Driscoll wrote McClanahan's stories read "like a modern Gogol gone small-town U.S.A."

In the summer of 2012, Lazy Fascist Press published The Collected Works of Scott McClanahan, reissuing the first two Stories collections.

Two more books, Crapalachia and Hill William, were published by Two Dollar Radio and Tyrant Books, respectively, in 2013.

McClanahan won Philadelphia's third Literary Death Match on May 23, 2012.

In 2014, McClanahan and his Holler Presents partner, Chris Oxley, released a limited edition vinyl single by their band, Holler Boys, on Fat Possum Records.

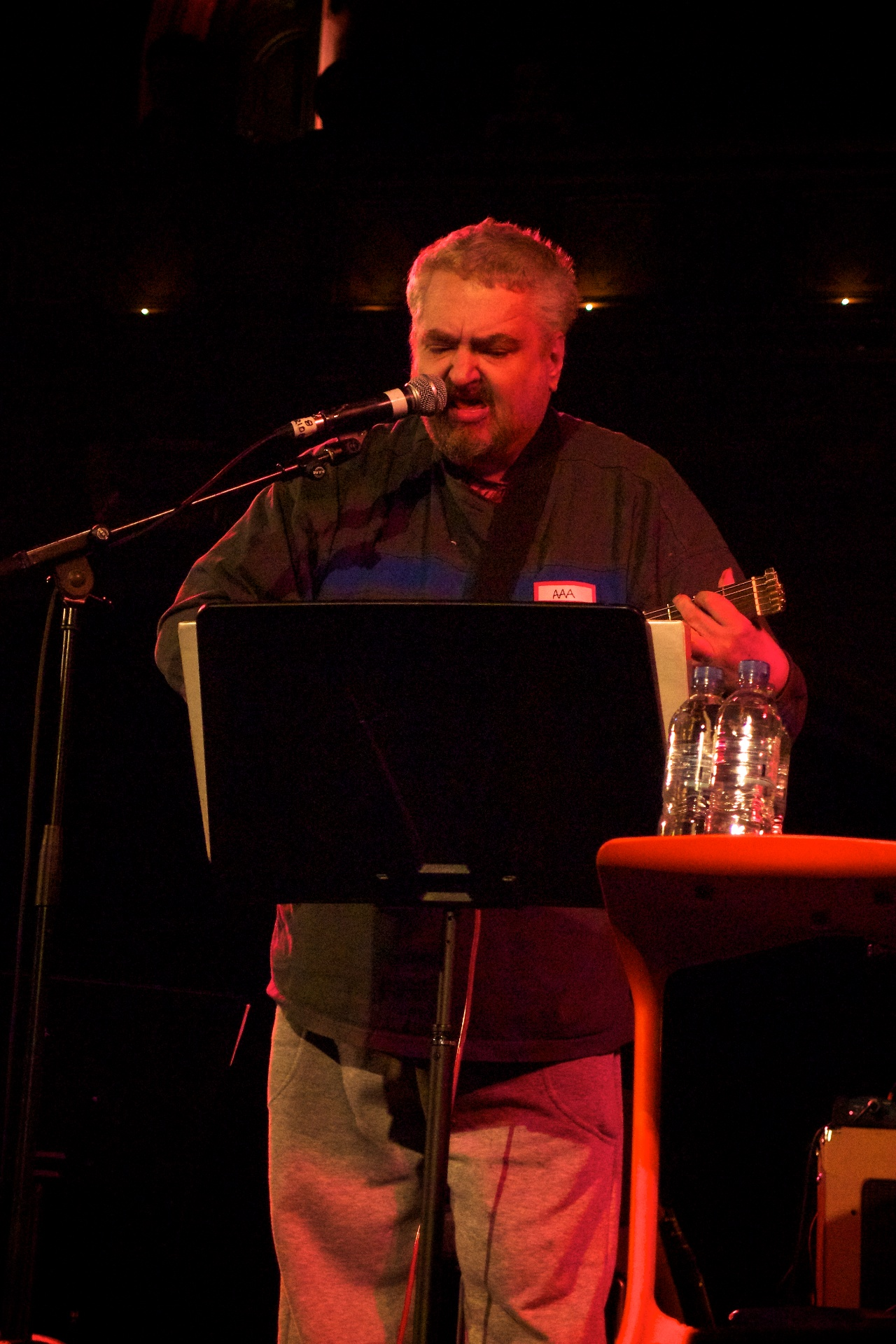
Daniel Johnston in concert

In 2016, Two Dollar Radio published The Incantations of Daniel Johnston, a graphic novel written by McClanahan and illustrated by Ricardo Covolo. McClanahan refers to it as a "doodle book" that relays the life of musician Daniel Johnston from his birth to the current day. It is described as a "loose biography, a history imagined" and covers mental illness, art, and, of course, music.

In 2021, McClanahan's 2017 novel The Sarah Book was adapted into a one-man show by Berliner Ensemble artistic director Oliver Reese, who then directed the production at London's The Coronet Theatre in 2022.

For over a decade McClanahan has taught introductory English courses at a community college and is also a filmmaker.

McClanahan is an author of the indie press world of authors and readers.

== Personal life ==
McClanahan has two children named Iris and Sam. He was formerly married to a woman named Sarah, and The Sarah Book is based in part on her and their marriage.

He resides in Beckley, West Virginia.

McClanahan has pursued other careers, including law.

== Critical response ==
McClanahan's work has garnered generally favorable reviews. In his review of Stories V! for The Huffington Post, Declan Tan wrote, "it doesn't have any of the staid and academically 'meta' tropes that often go with it; you can tell McClanahan feels something when he writes and when he lives. He wants you to feel something too. And he wants you to see the possibilities of the writer-reader interaction."

In their review of Crapalachia, The Paris Review said, "his voice is wholly unaffected, and his account manages to be both comic and unpretentiously sentimental," while Paste magazine called his writing "stark, beautiful" and that it "cannot be confined by genre."

Alison Glock of The New York Times said of Crapalachia, "McClanahan's prose is miasmic, dizzying, repetitive. A rushing river of words that reflects the chaos and humanity of the place from which he hails. He writes in an elliptical fever dream so contagious that slowing down is not an option. It would be like putting a doorstop in front of a speeding train. This is not a book you savor. It is one you inhale." Steve Donoghue, writing for The Washington Post, called Crapalachia "the genuine article: intelligent, atmospheric, raucously funny and utterly wrenching." In the New York Daily News, Michael Abolafia reviewed Hill William positively, saying that it "invites us to look into the heart of easily forgotten, off-the-beaten-path landscapes and the strangeness that permeates them, and we are better off for his words."

NPR called The Sarah Book "brave, triumphant and beautiful — it reads like a fever dream, and it feels like a miracle."

== Appalachia ==
Many of McClanahan's works are set in his home state of West Virginia. West Virginia exists within the Appalachian region, allowing works set in the state to be included in the genre of Appalachian literature. Across his career, McClanahan has been asked by interviewers about this connection. On this topic he says:

"I think our best American writers are regionalists. But those regions they're describing only exist in their brain. ... A pop song needs to be so broad that everybody can attach themselves to the emotions, but really the best pop songs are those that feel so specific that it allows you to attach your own specificity to it. West Virginia as a setting might be a bit unusual for readers who look for airport literature. But it's my place. Like Shane McGowan's Ireland, or Nick Cave's Berlin. I don't know if that Berlin ever existed, probably not, but it surely feels like it did."

== Bibliography ==
- Stories (2008, Six Gallery Press)
- Stories II (2009, Six Gallery Press)
- Stories V! (2011, Holler Presents)
- The Collected Works of Scott McClanahan Vol. 1 (2012, Lazy Fascist Press)
- Crapalachia (2013, Two Dollar Radio)
- Hill William (2013, Tyrant Books)
- The Incantations of Daniel Johnston (2016, Two Dollar Radio)
- The Sarah Book (2017, Tyrant Books)
- Fights! (2026, Rose Books)

== Discography ==
=== Singles ===
Year	Artist	Single	Label
2014	Holler Boys	"The Holy Holy Prayer"/"The Nah Nah Song"	Fat Possum Records
