= Atticus Lish =

American novelist

- Born: 1972 (age 53–54); Manhattan, New York City, New York, United States
- Education: Phillips Academy; Harvard University
- Occupation: Novelist
- Writing career
- Language: English
- Period: 2010–present

Atticus Lish (born 1972) is an American novelist. His debut, Preparation for the Next Life, caught its independent publisher, Tyrant, "off guard" by becoming a surprise success, winning a number of awards including the PEN/Faulkner Award for Fiction. Lish lives in Sunset Park, Brooklyn with his wife. He is the son of influential literary editor Gordon Lish.

== Preparation for the Next Life ==
Preparation for the Next Life is set mostly in Flushing, Queens, and follows two new arrivals to the city. Zou Lei is an illegal immigrant from the Chinese province of Xinjiang, daughter of a Uighur mother and a Han father. Brad Skinner is a Pennsylvania-born veteran of the Iraq war. While struggling to survive in New York's underground economy, Zou Lei meets Skinner, who is suffering from untreated combat trauma. Their attempts to build a life together, overcoming the violence, predation, and alienation surrounding them, amount to what Times critic Dwight Garner has called "perhaps the finest and most unsentimental love story of the new decade". The judges of the 2015 PEN/Faulkner Award praised the book for its blend of documentary detail and "incantation," stating that it "scours and illuminates the vast, traumatized America that lives, works and loves outside the castle gates."

== Personal and family life ==
Lish was born in Manhattan. Like his father, the younger Lish attended Phillips Academy, where he studied Mandarin. Lish describes his childhood as one of "huge privilege". His father's colleague, the novelist Don DeLillo, used a verbatim prose passage by the nine-year-old Atticus in his novel The Names, with an acknowledgement: "A printed shout from the housetops goes as well to Atticus Lish, in fond appreciation". Lish dropped out of Harvard University after two years. He then worked several unglamorous jobs, including Papaya King and a foam factory in Gardena, California. Lish joined the US Marine Corps, but was honorably discharged one and a half years into a four-year enlistment. Lish married his wife, Beth, a Korean-born schoolteacher, in 1995. In his mid-30s, Lish returned to Harvard and graduated with a thesis on Ascoli's theorem. During his second matriculation, Lish took a fiction course that inspired him to focus on writing. In 2005, Lish and his wife spent a year teaching English in China's Hubei Province; a visit to the remote northwest of the country became the inspiration for his Uighur protagonist. Lish moved to Brooklyn in 2006. He began work on Preparation for the Life to Come in 2008, and spent five years writing the book in longhand.

Of his relationship with his influential father, Lish has said: "When I was writing this book, I was completely isolated from family, from any of the significance my name might have had...It was me and my wife, living together, isolated from almost everybody." According to the Times, the death in 1994 of Gordon's wife, the mother of Atticus, led to a twelve-year estrangement between the two men. Lish maintains that the two have since reconciled, but that he would "absolutely not" have considered asking his well-respected father for help, either in writing or in marketing his work. However, after his manuscript was accepted by Tyrant's founder Giancarlo DiTrapano, Gordon Lish helped persuade his own literary agent, Amanda "Binky" Urban, to take his son on as a client. Urban has helped to sell British and French rights to Preparation for the Next Life, and is negotiating the sale of film rights.

A fluent Mandarin speaker, Lish was working as a technical translator at the time of his novel's publication. In November 2014, he told the Times he'd begun work on another novel. The Wall Street Journal reports the novel is set in Boston.

Lish claims not to read much recent fiction. In an interview with The New York Times, he cites movies, television, and music as sources of inspiration. "In training to write, I was drawn to Hemingway, Dos Passos, Flaubert, Tolstoy and the Bible. Maybe there's a throwback thing that people are getting into. It's like hemlines probably. They were short for a while, and now people are ready for them to be long again."

== Mixed martial arts career ==
Lish spent six years training to become a professional mixed-martial-arts fighter, and continues to practice grappling, including Brazilian jiujitsu, in New York City gyms. According to a 'Talk of the Town' piece in The New Yorker, Lish owns a 1–1–0 record in professional M.M.A. bouts.

== List of works ==
- Life is With People (New York: Tyrant Books, 2012) A difficult-to-classify work Lish describes as "a bildungsroman" and "a cautionary tale whose point is clear" (Tyrant website), with illustrations by the author.
- Preparation for the Next Life (New York: Tyrant Books, 2014)
- The War for Gloria (New York: Alfred A. Knopf, 2021)

== Awards and honors ==
- 2015 Plimpton Prize for Fiction, Preparation for the Next Life
- 2015 PEN/Faulkner Award for Fiction, Preparation for the Next Life
- 2015 Carla Furstenberg Cohen Literary Prize (given to authors of first or second books)
- 2015 New York City Book Award (Presented by the Society Library)
- 2016 Grand Prix de Littérature Américaine, Preparation for the Next Life
