= Cristine Brache =

American artist and writer

Cristine Brache (born 1984 in Miami) is an American artist, filmmaker, and writer of Puerto Rican and Cuban heritage. Her work spans painting, sculpture, and film often using encaustic wax, obsolete media, plexiglass, readymades, and textiles. She has since 2012 been exhibited internationally, in Europe, North America, and Australia. She has published two books of poetry: Poems, published by Codette in 2018 and Goodnight Sweet Thing, published by anonymous publishing in 2024.

== Education ==
Brache holds an MFA in Fine Art Media from the Slade School of Fine Art in London. She graduated from Florida State University in 2007 with a BFA in Studio Art, and attended Miami Southridge Senior High School.

== Career ==
In 2024, Brache co-directed, Goodnight Sweet Thing with artist and choreographer, Sigrid Lauren, a theater adaptation of her second book of poems of the same name. The performance art piece debuted in May 2024 in New York City. In October 2024, the performance had its European premiere at HAU Berlin during Creamcake's 3hd performance art festival.

From October 28 to November 28, 2018, Brache was a resident artist with Embajada in partnership with Artist Alliance Inc. (AAI) and Clemente Soto Vélez Cultural & Educational Center (The Clemente), in New York City.

Her work has been reviewed positively by publications like the New York Times, Cultured, Artforum, and the New Yorker. Her films have screened at Slamdance Film Festival, the Florida Film Festival, and Maryland Film Festival. In 2023, Brache won the $10,000 Knight Foundation Made in Dade Short Film Award from the Miami Film Festival for her short film, Carmen.

Her work is in the ICA Miami's permanent collection.

== Themes ==
The artist's work circulates around constructs of the female body and psyche, broken histories, masking, and the inevitable power dynamics accompanying these themes. In previous works she's also explored the institutionalization of women's pain and illness, as well as the ramifications of gaslighting—the pathologization of female emotion and expression. She articulates personal histories of female oppression with the wider context of history and art history. More recently, she is interested in the loss of meaning and time, mortality, nostalgia, and solitude.

Her poetry is described as "unapologetic...often placing the reader in the position of the voyeur, Brache’s poems ambiguously deal with identity, power dynamics, and templates of the female body and psyche."

== Personal life ==
From 2009 through 2014, Brache expatriated from the United States to squat in the United Kingdom, Europe, Turkey, and Thailand. She eventually moved to China, where she lived for two and a half years. In 2016, she married Canadian artist and writer Brad Phillips.

== Exhibitions ==
=== Solo exhibitions ===
- Bermuda Triangle, Anonymous Gallery, 2022
- Commit Me; Commit to Me, Fierman Gallery, 2020.
- Cristine's Secret Garden, Locust Projects, 2019.
- Go to Heaven (with Brad Phillips), Mana Contemporary, 2019.
- Epithalamium (with Brad Phillips), Anat Ebgi, 2019.
- Fucking Attention, MECA Art Fair, Fierman Gallery, 2018.
- I love me, I love me not, Fierman Gallery, 2017.

== Books ==
- Poems. New York: Codette (2018). ISBN 9780997062038.
- Goodnight Sweet Thing. New York: anonymous publishing (2024). ISBN 9798218409098.

== Awards ==
- 2023: The Knight Foundation Made in Dade Short Film Award, the Miami Film Festival
- 2021: The Ellies Awards, Oolite Arts
- 2019: The Ellies Awards, Oolite Arts
- 2018: South Florida Cultural Consortium
