= Peter Mendelsund =

American graphic designer, artist and author

- Education: Columbia University (BA); Mannes School of Music (MA)
- Occupations: book designer, artistic director, novelist
- Employer: The Atlantic
- Children: 2

Peter Mendelsund is an author, painter, graphic designer known for his book and magazine covers, and the creative director of The Atlantic. Mendelsund has been described by the New York Times as "one of the top designers at work today" and "the best book designer of his generation" by Wired.

He is the author of seven books, including three novels.

Mendelsund is co-founder, along with Emma Cline, of Picture Books, an imprint of Gagosian Gallery and led the founding of Atlantic Editions, a book imprint of The Atlantic magazine.

== Early life and education ==
Mendelsund grew up in Cambridge, Massachusetts, the son of Benjamin Mendelsund, and Judith Caton Gimbel. He is the grandson of former labor leader Henoch Mendelsund.

He graduated from Columbia University in 1991 as a philosophy major and received his master's degree in piano performance from the Mannes School of Music.

Following his graduation, he struggled to make a living as a pianist before training himself in graphic design and was hired by Chip Kidd to work at Vintage Books. He was later promoted to associate art director at Alfred A. Knopf and was art director of Pantheon Books and Vertical Press. He has designed critically acclaimed book covers for James Joyce, Vladimir Nabokov, Simone de Beauvoir, Julio Cortázar, Fyodor Dostoevsky, and Stieg Larsson. His book cover for The Girl with the Dragon Tattoo has been praised by The Wall Street Journal as "one of the most instantly recognizable and iconic book covers in contemporary fiction in the U.S."

During his tenure at Knopf, he also designed The Sewanee Review's first new cover in 73 years. He designed the cover for The New Yorker's May 11, 2015 issue, titled "Injustice: Baltimore, 2015."

In 2019, Mendelsund joined The Atlantic as its creative director, leading its rebranding and the redesign of the magazine.

Mendelsund's most recent books are the novel Weepers, and the memoir and art monograph Exhibitionist.
