= Tao Lin =

American novelist (born 1983)

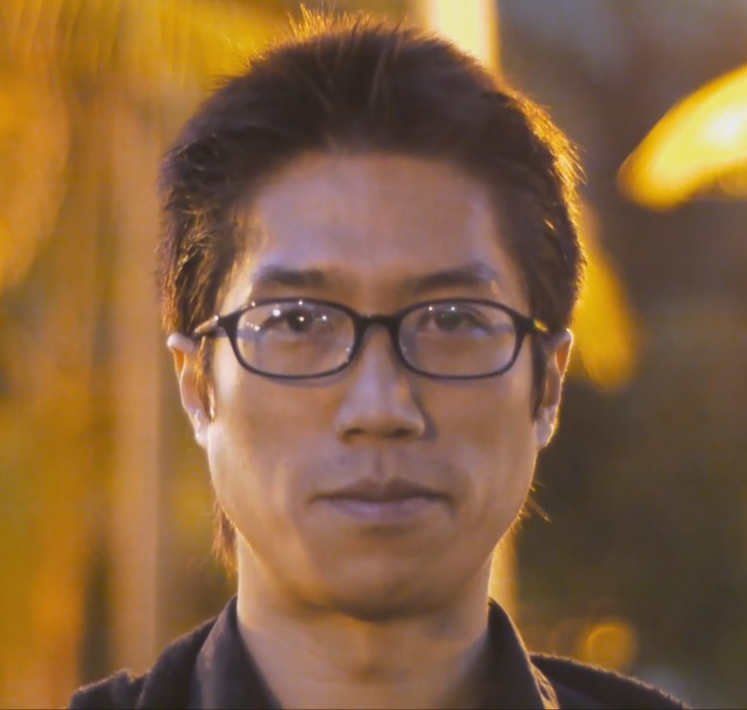
- Born: July 2, 1983 (age 43); Alexandria, Virginia, U.S.
- Education: New York University (BA)
- Occupations: Novelist; poet; journalist
- Spouse: Megan Boyle (m. 2010; sep. 2011)
- Writing career
- Genres: Literary fiction; Autofiction; Nonfiction; alt-lit; poetry
- Notable works: Taipei; Trip; Leave Society; Shoplifting from American Apparel

Chinese name
- Traditional Chinese: 林韜
- Simplified Chinese: 林韬
- Hanyu Pinyin: Lín Tāo
- IPA: [lǐn tʰáʊ]
- Hokkien POJ: Lîm Tho
- Website: taolin.us

Tao Lin (Chinese: 林韜; born July 2, 1983) is an American novelist, poet, essayist, short-story writer, and artist. He has published four novels, a novella, two books of poetry, a collection of short stories, and a memoir. He is best known for his autobiographical writing and his work on psychedelics.

== Life and education ==
Lin was born in Alexandria, Virginia, to a Taiwanese American family and grew up in suburbs in Orlando, Florida. He attended Lake Howell High School, and graduated from New York University in 2005 with a Bachelor of Arts (B.A.) in journalism.

For years, Lin abused multiple drugs, including amphetamines, opioids, MDMA, and benzodiazepines. He wrote about recovering from his pharmaceutical drug addiction in his 2018 book Trip: Psychedelics, Alienation, and Change. Lin moved to Hawaii in January 2020.

In a 2024 essay for Granta, Lin wrote that he was a materialist until about age 30, and that he developed spiritually through "two main factors": his DMT trips and the near-death experience (NDE) literature. He said these had changed his view of life from "a brief, panicky thing" to a "multi-reality-spanning mystery."

== Career ==
Lin's essays and book reviews have been published in The New York Times, The New York Times Book Review, Harper's Magazine, The Paris Review, Granta, and elsewhere.

His first book, the poetry collection you are a little bit happier than i am, was published by Action Books in 2006. His next five books were published by the independent press Melville House Publishing.

In 2008, Lin founded the independent press Muumuu House. The press has published four print books and over 100 stories, essays, and poems online, including work by Megan Boyle, Marie Calloway, Sheila Heti, and James Purdy.

Lin quit his job after selling shares of the future royalties of his novel Richard Yates online in 2009. After Richard Yates, Lin got a literary agent, Bill Clegg, who sold his next book, Taipei, to Vintage Books, which has published his subsequent work.

In 2011, Lin and his ex-wife Megan Boyle founded MDMAfilms, a film production company, through which they released three experimental films, including Mumblecore. The films were made using a Macbook's iSight camera on an extremely low budget.

Lin has lectured on his writing, poetry, and art at Vassar College, Kansas City Art Institute, UNC Chapel Hill, and other universities and museums, including the Museum of Modern Art and the New Museum. In 2012 and in 2015 he taught a graduate course at Sarah Lawrence College called "The Contemporary Short Story".

With his 2018 book Trip: Psychedelics, Alienation, and Change, Lin's work took a spiritual turn.

After his 2021 novel Leave Society, Lin published personal narrative essays in Granta, Harper's Magazine, and The Paris Review, and a book review in the New York Times Book Review.

== Critical response ==
L Magazine wrote, "We've long been deeply irked by Lin's vacuous posturing and 'I know you are but what am I' dorm-room philosophizing". Sam Anderson wrote in New York Magazine, "Dismissing Lin, however, ignores the fact that he is deeply smart, funny, and head-over-heels dedicated in exactly the way we like our young artists to be." Miranda July has called Lin's work "moving and necessary". In n+1, critic Frank Guan called Lin "the first great male Asian author of American descent [sic]".

Lin's early writing has been criticized as detached and bleak, with NPR calling it "boring and harrowing". His work has been praised in the UK, including in The Guardian and the Times Literary Supplement, which called Lin "a daring, urgent voice for a malfunctioning age", and a 2010 career overview by the London Review of Books.

Since 2013, Lin's work has been associated with the mode of writing called "autofiction", post-postmodernist aesthetics and posthumanist philosophy. Fellow autofictioners have praised his work. Ben Lerner said, "One thing I like about Tao's writing is how beside the point for me 'liking' it feels—it's a frank depiction of the rhythm of a contemporary consciousness or lack of consciousness and so it has a power that bypasses those questions of taste entirely. Like it or not, it has the force of the real."

In a 2025 essay on contemporary alternative literature published in The Point, critic Sam Kriss discussed Leave Society (2021) and Lin's subsequent nonfiction, identifying sincerity as a distinguishing feature of Lin's writing. Kriss wrote, "There is, in fact, something luminous about Tao Lin's sincerity", but expressed skepticism about Lin's health claims.

== Mandalas ==
Lin began drawing what he called "mandalas" in 2014. Initially, he sold them on eBay. In a 2016 interview with ArtNews, he said, "While drawing I will sometimes imagine I'm creating a world that I'll have to exist in, or that I'd like to explore".

== Books ==
=== you are a little bit happier than i am (2006) ===
In November 2006 Lin's first book, a poetry collection titled you are a little bit happier than i am, was published. It was the winner of Action Books' December Prize and has been a small-press bestseller.

=== Eeeee Eee Eeee and Bed (2007) ===
In May 2007 Lin's first novel, Eeeee Eee Eeee, and first story collection, Bed, were published simultaneously. Of the stories, Jennifer Bassett wrote in KGB Lit Journal, "In structure and tone, they have the feel of early Lorrie Moore and Deborah Eisenberg. Like Moore's characters, there are a lot of plays on language and within each story, a return to the same images or ideas—or jokes. And like Moore, most of these characters live in New York, are unemployed or recently employed, and are originally from somewhere more provincial (Florida in Lin's case, Wisconsin in Moore's). However, Lin knows to dig a little deeper into his characters—something we see in Moore's later stories, but less so in her early ones." Reviewing Eeeee Eee Eeee for the Prague Literary Review, Travis Jeppesen praised the musicality of Lin's language, comparing it to the work of Stephen Dixon and Gertrude Stein.

The books were ignored by most mainstream media but have since been referenced in The Independent (which called Eeeee Eee Eeee "a wonderfully deadpan joke") and The New York Times, which called Lin a "deadpan literary trickster" in reference to Eeeee Eee Eeee.

=== cognitive-behavioral therapy (2008) ===
In May 2008 Lin's second poetry collection, cognitive-behavioral therapy was published. The poem "room night" from this collection was anthologized in Wave Books' State of the Union.

=== Shoplifting from American Apparel (2009) ===
In September 2009 Lin's novella Shoplifting from American Apparel was published to mixed reviews. The Guardian wrote, "Trancelike and often hilarious… Lin's writing is reminiscent of early Douglas Coupland, or early Bret Easton Ellis, but there is also something going on here that is more profoundly peculiar, even Beckettian." The Village Voice called it a "fragile, elusive book". Time Out New York wrote, "Writing about being an artist makes most contemporary artists self-conscious, squeamish and arch. Lin, however, appears to be comfortable, even earnest, when his characters try to describe their aspirations (or their shortcomings) [...] purposefully raw." The San Francisco Chronicle wrote, "Tao Lin's sly, forlorn, deadpan humor jumps off the page". The Los Angeles Times wrote, "Camus' The Stranger or sociopath?"; the Austin Chronicle called it "scathingly funny" and wrote, "it might just be the future of literature". Another reviewer called it "a vehicle...for self-promotion." The same month, clothing retailer Urban Outfitters began selling Shoplifting from American Apparel in its stores.

=== Richard Yates (2010) ===
Lin's second novel, Richard Yates, was published on September 7, 2010, by Melville House. In The Boston Globe, Danielle Dreilinger called it "a focused, moving, and rather upsetting portrait of two oddballs in love." In a review for The New York Times, Charles Bock wrote, "By the time I reached the last 50 pages, each time the characters said they wanted to kill themselves, I knew exactly how they felt."

The novel's autobiographical basis later received attention. In 2014, the website Jezebel posted screenshots of deleted tweets by writer E.R. Kennedy, alleging statutory rape and plagiarism. The allegations stem from 2005, when Kennedy, then 16, and Lin, then 22, dated. Lin denied the allegations. A 2021 New Yorker article noted that the relationship was the subject of Richard Yates, and that at 16, Kennedy had been legally old enough to consent in Pennsylvania, where the relationship had taken place.

=== Taipei (2013) ===
On February 23, 2013, Publishers Weekly awarded Taipei a starred review, predicting it would be Lin's "breakout" book and calling it "a novel about disaffection that's oddly affecting" and "a book without an ounce of self-pity, melodrama, or posturing". The same month, Bret Easton Ellis tweeted, "With Taipei Tao Lin becomes the most interesting prose stylist of his generation, which doesn't mean that Taipei isn't a boring novel". (Lin and his publishers omitted the words after "generation" in a blurb they printed on Taipei's cover.)

Taipei was published by Vintage on June 4, 2013, to mostly positive reviews. In the New York Observer, novelist Benjamin Lytal called it Lin's "modernist masterpiece", adding, "we should stop calling Tao Lin the voice of his generation. Taipei, his new novel, has less to do with his generation than with the literary tradition of Knut Hamsun, Ernest Hemingway, and Robert Musil." According to Slate, "Taipei casts a surprisingly introspective eye on the spare, 21st-century landscape Lin has such a knack for depicting".

New York Times critic Dwight Garner wrote, "I loathe reviews in which a critic claims to have love-hate feelings about a work of art. It's a way of having no opinion at all. But I love and hate Taipei".

On June 18, critic Emily Witt wrote in The Daily Beast:

Taipei is exactly the kind of book I hoped Tao Lin would one day write. He is one of the few fiction writers around who engages with contemporary life, rather than treating his writing online as existing in opposition to or apart from the hallowed analog space of the novel. He's consistently good for a few laughs and writes in a singular style already much imitated by his many sycophants on the Internet. Some people like Tao Lin for solely these reasons, or treat him as a sort of novelty or joke. But Lin can also produce the feelings of existential wonder that all good novelists provoke.

On June 30, in The New York Times Book Review, Clancy Martin wrote:

His writing is weird, upsetting, memorable, honest—and it's only getting better [...] But I didn't anticipate Taipei, his latest, which is, to put it bluntly, a gigantic leap forward. Here we have a serious, first-rate novelist putting all his skills to work. Taipei is a love story, and although it's Lin's third novel it's also, in a sense, a classic first novel: it's semi-autobiographical (Lin has described it as the distillation of 25,000 pages of memory) and it's a bildungsroman...

Other reviews of the novel were mixed.

On July 5, The New York Times Book Review awarded Taipei an Editors' Choice distinction. It was the only paperback on the list for the week.

On KCRW's "Bookworm", in conversation with Lin, Silverblatt called it "the most moving depiction of the way we live now" and "unbearably moving".

Taipei was included on lists of the best books of the year by the Times Literary Supplement, Village Voice, Slate, Salon, Bookforum, The Week, Maisonneuve, and Complex, among others.

High Resolution, a film adaptation of Taipei, was released in 2018.

=== Selected Tweets (2015) ===
On June 15, 2015, Short Flight/Long Drive Books published the collaborative double-book Selected Tweets by Lin and poet Mira Gonzalez. The book features selections from eight years of their tweets at nine different Twitter accounts, as well as visual art by each author, footnotes, and "Extras". In Electric Literature, Andrea Longini wrote that Lin and Gonzalez had "elevated the medium into an art form with the power to transmit authentic observations".

=== Trip (2018) ===
In May 2018, Lin's Trip: Psychedelics, Alienation, and Change, a nonfiction account of his experiences with psychedelic drugs, was published by Vintage Books. Much of the book is devoted to Lin's continuing fascination with the life and thought of Terence McKenna, as well as an introduction to McKenna's ex-wife Kathleen Harrison.

Trip was a Los Angeles Times bestseller. In Scientific American, John Horgan wrote, "If an aspirant asks for an example of experimental science writing, I'll recommend Trip. The book veers from excruciatingly candid autobiography to biography (of McKenna) to investigative journalism…to interview-based journalism to philosophical speculation to first-person accounts of the effects of DMT and Salvia." Of Trip, Sheila Heti wrote, "This book has changed how I understand myself on a cellular level. It's a superbly researched, moving, and formally inventive quest for re-enchantment, and Tao Lin's most compelling and profound book yet."

=== Leave Society (2021) ===
Lin's fourth novel, Leave Society, was published on August 3, 2021. In a review published online on the book's release date and later in the print edition of The New York Times Book Review, Christine Smallwood wrote of its main character: "Li has left behind speed, despair and his belief in Western medicine. (He refuses steroid shots for his back pain.) But what he is really recovering from is existentialism, the idea that life has no meaning other than what we give it. He now believes that the world has an inherent purpose ... Stylistically, the book is artful, even radical".

== Bibliography ==
=== Poetry ===
- this emotion was a little e-book, (bear parade, 2006)
- you are a little bit happier than i am, (Action Books, 2006)
- cognitive-behavioral therapy, (Melville House, 2008)

=== Novels ===
- Eeeee Eee Eeee (Melville House, 2007)
- Richard Yates (Melville House, 2010)
- Taipei (Vintage Books, 2013)
- Leave Society (Vintage Books, 2021)

=== Novellas ===
- Shoplifting from American Apparel (Melville House, 2009)

=== Stories ===
- Today The Sky is Blue and White with Bright Blue Spots and a Small Pale Moon and I Will Destroy Our Relationship Today, (bear parade, 2006)
- Bed (Melville House, 2007)

=== Nonfiction ===
- Selected Tweets (Short Flight/Long Drive Books, 2015)
- Trip: Psychedelics, Alienation, and Change (Vintage Books, 2018)

=== Essays ===
- "The Story of Autism". Mars Review of Books. September 20, 2022.
- "My Spiritual Evolution". Granta. October 30, 2024.
- "Gian". Granta. April 24, 2025.
- "Nini". Harper's Magazine. August 25, 2025.
- "GemStone". The Paris Review. March 25, 2026.
- "Taiwan English". The Paris Review Daily. June 24, 2026.
- "Hawaiian Fauna". Granta. September 10, 2026.
