= Autofiction =

Form of fictionalized autobiography

In literary criticism, autofiction is a form of fictionalized autobiography.

== Definition ==
In autofiction, an author may decide to recount their life in the third person, modify significant details and characters, or use invented subplots and imagined scenarios with real-life characters in service of an accurately portrayed self within the narrative. In this way, autofiction largely resembles roman à clef literature, though autofiction typically acknowledges its depiction of the author's real life. It also shares similarities with faction, a genre devised by Truman Capote to describe his work of narrative nonfiction In Cold Blood.

Serge Doubrovsky coined the term in 1977 with reference to his novel Fils. However, autofiction arguably existed as a practice with ancient roots long before Doubrovsky coined the term. Michael Skafidas argues that the first-person narrative can be traced back to the confessional subtleties of Sappho's lyric "I." Philippe Vilain distinguishes autofiction from autobiographical novels in that autofiction requires a first-person narrative by a protagonist who has the same name as the author. Elizabeth Hardwick's novel Sleepless Nights, W. G. Sebald's Vertigo, and Chris Kraus's I Love Dick have been deemed early seminal works popularizing the form of autofiction.

== Uses ==
In India, autofiction has been associated with the works of Hainsia Olindi and postmodern Tamil writer Charu Nivedita. His novel Zero Degree (1998), a groundbreaking work in Tamil literature, and his Marginal Man are examples of this genre. In Urdu the fiction novels of Rahman Abbas are considered major works of autofiction, especially his two novels Nakhalistan Ki Talash (In Search of an Oasis) and Khuda Ke Saaye Mein Ankh Micholi (Hide and Seek in the Shadow of God). Japanese author Hitomi Kanehara wrote a novel titled Autofiction.

In a 2018 article for New York magazine's website Vulture, literary critic Christian Lorentzen wrote, "The term autofiction has been in vogue for the past decade to describe a wave of very good American novels by the likes of Sheila Heti, Ben Lerner, Teju Cole, Jenny Offill, and Tao Lin, among others, as well as the multivolume epic My Struggle by the Norwegian Karl Ove Knausgaard." He elaborated:

The way the term is used tends to be unstable, which makes sense for a genre that blends fiction and what may appear to be fact into an unstable compound. In the past, I've tried to make a distinction in my own use of the term between autobiographical fiction, autobiographical metafiction, and autofiction, arguing that in autofiction there tends to be an emphasis on the narrator's or protagonist's or authorial alter ego's status as a writer or artist and that the book's creation is inscribed in the book itself.

== Notable authors ==
- Ayad Akhtar
- Vassilis Alexakis
- Sherman Alexie
- Martin Amis
- Christine Angot
- James Baldwin
- Claire-Louise Bennett
- Lucia Berlin
- Megan Boyle
- Charles Bukowski
- Aldo Busi
- Emmanuel Carrère
- Louis-Ferdinand Céline
- Durga Chew-Bose
- J. M. Coetzee
- Teju Cole
- Jennifer Croft
- Rachel Cusk
- Chloe Delaume
- Philip K. Dick
- Marguerite Duras
- Andrew Durbin
- Guillaume Dustan
- Geoff Dyer
- Bret Easton Ellis
- Annie Ernaux
- Hervé Guibert
- Elizabeth Hardwick
- Sven Hassel
- Sheila Heti
- Michel Houellebecq
- Christopher Isherwood
- James Joyce
- Jack Kerouac
- Karl Ove Knausgaard
- Chris Kraus
- Ben Lerner
- Tao Lin
- Patricia Lockwood
- Édouard Louis
- Norm Macdonald
- Curzio Malaparte
- Dambudzo Marechera
- William Keepers Maxwell Jr.
- Henry Miller
- Catherine Millet
- Patrick Modiano
- Eileen Myles
- V. S. Naipaul
- Doireann Ní Ghríofa
- Charu Nivedita
- Amélie Nothomb
- Vladimir Oravsky
- Ilja Leonard Pfeijffer
- Emmelie Prophète
- Marcel Proust
- Olivia Rosenthal
- Philip Roth
- Françoise Sagan
- W. G. Sebald
- Emily Segal
- Vanessa Springora
- Natasha Stagg
- Maria Stepanova
- Kamala Surayya
- Abdellah Taïa
- Hunter S. Thompson
- Lily Tuck
- Oksana Vasyakina
- Ocean Vuong
- Anne Wiazemsky
- Kate Zambreno
- Fritz Zorn

== See also ==
- Autobiografiction
- Autobiographical novel
- Biography in literature
- Fake memoir
- I-novel
- Misery literature
- Non-fiction novel
- Roman à clef
