= Tyrant Books =

Independent book publisher based in Rome, Italy and New York

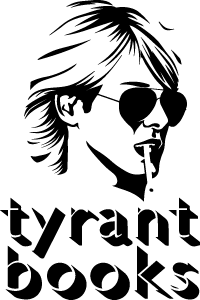
- Founded: 2009; 16 years ago
- Founder: Giancarlo DiTrapano
- Headquarters location: New York City; Rome
- Publication types: Books, magazines
- Official website: nytyrant.com

Tyrant Books is an independent book publisher based in Rome, Italy and New York, New York. It was created in 2009 by Giancarlo DiTrapano as an offshoot of New York Tyrant Magazine, which was also founded by DiTrapano, in 2006.

== History ==
Tyrant Books was created to publish books less suited to large publishing houses, often because of their non-mainstream appeal. Giancarlo DiTrapano is quoted in the Los Angeles Review of Books as saying: "It would have taken forever for me to do anything I wanted to do [working for a traditional publishing house], but I had a little money, so I started a press."

In 2006, he founded New York Tyrant Magazine, which published "writers the big houses refused to touch". The magazine was put on hiatus until December 2016, when it was brought back as an online journal, with Jordan Castro as editor.

In 2009, the magazine marked the beginning of the publication's transition to book publishing when it published 500 copies of the novella Baby Leg by Brian Evenson.

In 2013, Tyrant Books partnered with Fat Possum Records after DiTrapano met with Matthew Johnson, owner of Fat Possum Records. Johnson developed an interest in saving the publishing house — which was struggling financially — and became 50 percent owner. He took over the business aspects of Tyrant Books while DiTrapano was freed to focus more on the editorial side of the business.

In 2014, Tyrant Books published Preparation for the Next Life by Atticus Lish, winner of the 2015 PEN/Faulkner Prize for fiction. As of January 2015, the book had sold 15,000 copies.

DiTrapano, a native of Charleston, West Virginia, died in March 2021, at the age of 47.

In 2022 family and friends of Giancarlo DiTrapano launched The Giancarlo DiTrapano Foundation for Literature and the Arts. Its stated mission is "to extend the legacy of our namesake, publisher Giancarlo DiTrapano, by funding and hosting creative residencies, fostering communities of creativity through readings and other events, and maintaining an editorial archive at our 17th-century villa and cultural center in Sezze Romano, Italy."

== Publications of Tyrant Books ==
- Baby Leg, Brian Evenson (2009) - Fiction
- Firework, Eugene Marten (2010, 2017 re-release) - Fiction/Literary
- Us, Michael Kimball (2011) - Fiction/Psychological
- Life is With People, Atticus Lish (2011) - Drawings
- Sky Saw, Blake Butler (2012) - Fiction/Gothic
- Strange Cowboy, Lincoln Dahl Turns Five, Sam Michel (2012) - Fiction/Literary
- Solip, Ken Baumann (2013) - Fiction/Literary
- What Purpose Did I Serve In Your Life, Marie Calloway (2013) - Fiction/Short Stories
- Hill William, Scott McClanahan (2013) - Fiction/Cultural Heritage
- Preparation For The Next Life, Atticus Lish (2014) - Fiction/Literary
- Bad Sex, Clancy Martin (2015) - Fiction/Literary
- Supremacist, David Shapiro (2016) - Fiction/Literary
- White Nights in Split Town City, Annie DeWitt (2016) - Fiction/Literary
- Literally Show Me a Healthy Person, Darcie Wilder (2017) - Fiction/Literary
- The Sarah Book, Scott McClanahan (2017) - Fiction/Literary
- Floating Notes, Babak Lakghomi (2018) - Fiction/Literary
- Liveblog, Megan Boyle (2018) - Fiction/Literary
- Under the Sea, Mark Leidner (2018) - Fiction/Literary
- Welfare, Steve Anwyll (2019) - Fiction/Literary
- Essays and Fictions, Brad Phillips (2019) - Fiction/Literary
- The Great American Suction, David Nutt (2019) - Fiction/Literary
- Vincent and Alice and Alice, Shane Jones (2019) - Fiction/Literary
- The Complete Gary Lutz, Gary Lutz (2019) - Fiction/Literary
- Pets, Jordan Castro (editor), 2020 - Fiction and Nonfiction/Literary
