= Muumuu House =

American publishing company

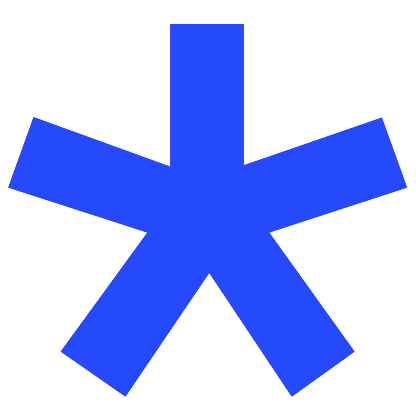
- Status: Active
- Founded: 2008
- Founder: Tao Lin
- Country of origin: United States
- Headquarters location: Manhattan, New York
- Distribution: Worldwide
- Key people: Tao Lin
- Publication types: Books
- Fiction genres: fiction, poetry, nonfiction
- Official website: www.muumuuhouse.com

Muumuu House is an independent, small press publishing company and online literary magazine based formerly in Manhattan, New York, and currently in Hawaii that was founded by writer Tao Lin in 2008. Muumuu House publishes poetry, fiction, and nonfiction in print and online.

Muumuu House has published print books by writers Zac Smith, Megan Boyle, Brandon Scott Gorrell, and Ellen Kennedy.

Online publications have included works by Jordan Castro, Ben Lerner, Sheila Heti, Michael W. Clune, Deb Olin Unferth, Sam Pink, Megan Boyle, Anna Dorn, Stacey Levine, Matthew Davis, and Matthew Rohrer.

== Publications ==
- Smith, Zac. 2022. Everything Is Totally Fine. Muumuu House. OCLC 0982206763
- Boyle, Megan. 2011. selected unpublished blog posts of a Mexican panda express employee. Muumuu House. OCLC 704388946
- Gorrell, Brandon Scott. 2009. during my nervous breakdown i want to have a biographer present. Muumuu House. OCLC 429542245
- Kennedy, Ellen. 2009. sometimes my heart pushes my ribs. Muumuu House. OCLC 319212135
