= The Quarterly =

Literary publication

- Categories: Literary magazine
- Frequency: Quarterly
- Publisher: Vintage Books / Random House
- Founder: Gordon Lish
- First issue: Spring 1987
- Final issue: Fall 1995
- Country: United States
- Based in: New York City
- Language: English
- ISSN: 0893-3103
- OCLC: 15501074

The Quarterly was an avant-garde literary magazine founded and edited by Gordon Lish in 1987. It was published by Vintage Books / Random House in New York City. The Quarterly showcased the work of contemporary authors. The magazine contained fiction, poetry and commentary. It ceased publication in 1995.

Volume 1 of The Quarterly was published in Spring 1987. "The Magazine of New American Writing" featured works by: Amy Hempel, Tom Spanbauer, Matthew Levine, Jane Smiley, Jack Gilbert, Harold Brodkey, Patty Marx and others.

Volume 2 of The Quarterly was published in Summer 1987. "The Magazine of New American Writing" featured works by: Noy Holland, Mark Richard, Nancy Lemann, Ann Pyne, Jack Gilbert, Paulette Jiles, Rick Bass and others.

Volume 3 of The Quarterly was published in Fall 1987. "The Magazine of New American Writing" featured works by: Mark Richard, Hellen Schulman, Ted Pejovich, Sunny Rogers, Ann Pyne, Diane Williams, Rick Bass and others.

Volume 4 of The Quarterly was published in Winter 1987. "The Magazine of New American Writing" featured works by: Sharon Dupree, Mark Richard, Michael Hickins, Yannick Murphy, Patrick McGrath, Jan Pendleton, Rebecca Bondor, George Angel, Stephen O'Connor and others.

Volume 5 of The Quarterly was published in Spring 1988. "The Magazine of New American Writing" featured works by: Jennifer Allen, William Tester, Janet Mitchell, Sharon Dupree, Robert Fox, Sheila Kohler and others.

Volume 6 of The Quarterly was published in Summer 1988. "The Magazine of New American Writing" featured works by: Ann Pyne, Jan Pendleton, Victor Barall, Jennifer Allen, Harold Brodkey, M. D. Stein and others.

The Quarterly ended with the final publication of volume 31 in the Fall of 1995.
