= Monkeybicycle =

Literary journal

Monkeybicycle is a literary journal with both print and Web versions. It was founded in 2002 in Seattle, Washington, by Steven Seighman. He was intent on publishing both well-known writers and those who might not have been heard of yet, but should be. He enlisted the help of writer Shya Scanlon and together ran both versions of the journal, as well as created a very successful monthly reading series in downtown Seattle.

In 2007, Monkeybicycle became an imprint of Dzanc Books.

== Monkeybicycle.net ==
The Monkeybicycle Web site is updated twice each week. Since its inception in 2002, it has gained quite a following. With features like One-sentence stories, videos and audio podcasts, the site receives between 350–400 unique visitors per day. Past Web site editors have included Matthew Simmons, Andrew Ervin, and Eric Spitznagel.

In 2007, one of monkeybicycle.net's stories, "Beginnings of Ten Stories About Ponies," by Wendy Molyneux, was selected for inclusion in the Dave Eggers edited the Best American Nonrequired Reading 2007 anthology. Another story, "The Day the Aliens Brought the Pancakes" by Eric Spitznagel, was also selected as a "notable" story in the anthology.

In 2008, two of monkeybicycle.net's stories, "Feet in Socks" by Amy Guth and "Intellectual Property" by Angela Woodward were selected as notable stories for the 2008 Million Writers Award.

In 2009, Stefanie Freele's story, "Tinfoilers," was one of the Wigleaf Top 50 (Very) Short Fictions, selected by editor Darlin' Neal.

=== Writers who have appeared on the Monkeybicycle Web site ===
- Charlie Jane Anders
- Blake Butler
- Stephen Elliott
- Roxane Gay
- Sean Gill
- J. Robert Lennon
- Tao Lin
- Patton Oswalt
- Davy Rothbart

== The Monkeybicycle print edition ==
Twice each year, Monkeybicycle publishes a print edition, which features fiction, poetry and nonfiction. It is available in several bookstores around the United States, as well as on the Monkeybicycle Web site. Each edition costs $12.00, and two- and four-issue subscriptions are also available at a discounted rate.

=== Writers who have appeared in the Monkeybicycle print edition ===
- Steve Almond
- Charlie Jane Anders
- Chris Bachelder
- Matt Bell
- Ryan Boudinot
- Arthur Bradford
- Susannah Breslin
- David Cross
- Elizabeth Ellen
- Stephen Elliott (author)
- Pia Z. Ehrhardt
- Andrew Ervin
- Bob Fingerman
- Roxane Gay
- Peter Grosz
- Amy Guth (author, writer, radio host)
- Michael Hickins
- Samantha Hunt
- Dan Kennedy
- Lawrence Krauser
- Ben Loory
- Wendy Molyneux
- Patton Oswalt
- Dawn Raffel
- Sarah Silverman
- Laura van den Berg
- Many others

=== Monkeybicycle3 ===
The third print issue of Monkeybicycle was published in 2004 as a joint effort with the literary journal, Hobart. One of this issue's stories, "Free Burgers for Life," written by Ryan Boudinot, was accepted for inclusion in The Best American Nonrequired Reading 2003.

=== Monkeybicycle5 ===
This version of the Monkeybicycle print edition is all humor, is guest-edited by Eric Spitznagel, and contains an introduction from comedian David Cross. It also features contributions from Patton Oswalt and a comic drawn by Johnny Ryan and written by Sarah Silverman.

=== Monkeybicycle6 ===
Issue six of Monkeybicycle received fantastic reviews in print and on the web. It's the highest-selling issue to date.

=== Monkeybicycle7 ===
Issue seven of the magazine was published in August 2010. Contributors are: Elizabeth Alexander, Angi Becker Stevens, Ryan Boudinot, Rita Dahl, Craig Davis, Andrew Ervin, Molly Gaudry, Roxane Gay, Aaron Gilbreath, Reed Hearne, James Kaelan, Corey Mesler, Weam Namou, Daniel Romo, Ken Saji, Shya Scanlon, Tyler Stoddard Smith, Rebecca van Laer, Yassen Vassilev, Edwin Wilson Rivera, and Michael Wood.

== Monkeybicycle staff ==
- Founding Editor: Steven Seighman
- Web Editor: James Tate Hill

Previous Editors: J. Bradley, Laura Carney, Andrew Ervin, Jessa Marsh, Eddie Rathke, Shya Scanlon, Katie Schwartz, Matthew Simmons, Jacob Smith, Eric Spitznagel, J.A. Tyler

== See also ==
- List of literary magazines
