= Anthony Giardina =

American dramatist

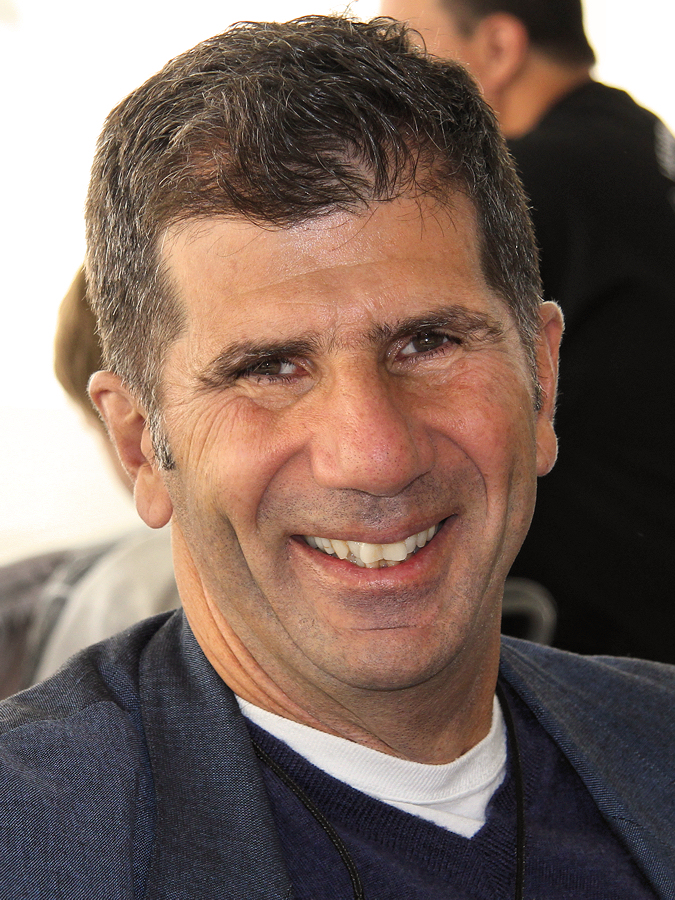
Anthony Giardina at the 2012 Texas Book Festival.

Anthony Giardina (born 1950) is an American novelist, short story writer, essayist and playwright. Giardina started his professional career as an actor. He switched to play writing, and eventually began writing novels.

His work is particularly influenced by American culture in the 1950s. He was born in 1950 and grew up on a street in Waltham, Massachusetts, a largely Italian and Irish working class "sleeper" suburb of Boston on the trolley line to Cambridge. The protagonist's childhood neighborhood and schools in Recent History were largely modeled on Waltham.

== Career ==
Giardina's plays have been produced in New Haven, New York City, and Washington, D.C. He is a regular contributor to publications such as The New York Times Magazine, GQ, Esquire, and Harper's. His books include Men With Debts, A Boy's Pretensions, Recent History, The Country of Marriage, and White Guys.

His play Living At Home opened Off-Broadway at Playwrights Horizons in December 1978. His play The City of Conversation opened Off-Broadway at the Lincoln Center Mitzi Newhouse Theater in May 2014, and was nominated for the 2015 Outer Critics Circle Award for Outstanding New Off-Broadway Play. HIs play Black Forest premiered at the Long Wharf Theatre, Connecticut in March–April 2000. Two plays, Black Forest and Custody Of The Eyes, are published by Broadway Play Publishing Inc.

His novel, Norumbega Park, was released by Farrar, Straus and Giroux on January 31, 2012. His newest novel, Remember This, was released by Farrar, Straus and Giroux on March 4, 2025.

== Teaching ==
He has held teaching positions at Mount Holyoke College, the University of Rochester the University of Massachusetts Amherst, and The University of Texas at Austin. Giardina currently teaches at Smith College.

== Quote ==
Anthony Giardina on writing: "When I write fiction, I become the character I'm writing about, just as an actor becomes a character he's playing. You use parts of yourself, people you have known, things that have happened to you, but you're always aware that these things are being used to create a persona that's distinctly not you. Otherwise it wouldn't be any fun."

== See also ==
- Chris Bachelder
- Peter Gizzi
- James Tate
- Noy Holland
- Sabina Murray
- Dara Wier
- Sam Michel
