= We Can Report Them =

Novel by Michael Brodsky

- Cover of the 1st edition
- Author: Michael Brodsky
- Cover artist: Laurie Dolphin Design
- Language: English
- Genre: Postmodern literature
- Publisher: 1999 (Four Walls Eight Windows)
- Media type: Print (paperback)
- Pages: 340
- ISBN: 978-1-56858-144-6

We Can Report Them is Michael Brodsky's sixth novel. The novel intertwines death and creation, centering on the making of a commercial glorifying a serial killer's last days. Bert, the commercial's director, must also deal with two terminally ill patients, first his stepfather Albert, then his mother-in-law Joyce.

Several reviews noted that We Can Report Them has a more straightforward narrative than Brodsky's previous ***. Nevertheless, the novel is filled with mathematical allusions (Cantor and transfinite cardinals, topology, infinite series, Turing machines) and to kabbalistic allusions (tsimtsum, ein sof, sefirot, Isaac Luria). It is also dense with philosophical discussion, with frequent allusions to Heidegger and Charles Peirce. Prominent film makers and critics, including Robert Bresson and Manny Farber, are also referred to.

== Plot summary ==
The novel begins (with deceptively straightforward text) by introducing Bert and Belle, "a truly happy pair", a married couple living in a suburb near Manhattan. Bert works for the Turing Advertising Agency, directing commercials. His stepfather, Albert, has been in a hospital, on his deathbed, for several years.

The action begins with Bert picking up Belle's mother, Joyce, and Joyce's current husband, Leonard at the airport. We learn also Joyce's previous husbands include Fred, now Joyce's lawyer, and her unnamed third husband, Belle's father. (We later learn that her fourth husband was named Murray.)

Bert then makes a pickup of B. Austin Samuels, his boss at the 60th Street Heliport. A new client was loco about Bert's previous commercial, "The Reflection Principle". But the bad news (it's very bad news, as will be evident later on) is that Bert did not make the Floyd Flowers best-dressed list.

Bert visits his father in the hospital, talking with Doctors Pratt and Grass. They deliver speeches on the meaning of symptoms, illness, and death. They are critical of Albert, who keeps permuting his symptoms.

Bert returns to a work conference, attended by Samuels and one of his dedicated lieutenants, GreenHurstWood (usually referred to as GHW). They explain to Bert how his career is pretty much doomed by failing to make Flowers' list. Samuels recommends Bert trying loving his stepfather. Bert returns to the hospital, only to learn that Albert has died after a successful "unanticipated tonsillectomy."

After a short memorial service and funeral, Bert meets in a downtown converted warehouse with Samuels and the commercial's principal actors: Priscilla, who plays the victim's wife, Gift, who plays Pudd, the serial killer, and Ralph, who plays the victim, Hector Berlio. Bert explains what the meaning of acting is, partly in terms of anecdotes about his "old pal, Marty Heidigger (sic)".

Bert then outlines in great detail the sequence of events and motivations. Gift is trying to find his perfect victim, but is settling for the "average" of all his victims. The action is to begin when Gift follows Ralph home. Ralph is to open and close his keyed mailbox at least 70 times, a serial act that the serial killer can envy.

The outline is interrupted by another hospital visit by Bert. This time, it's his mother-in-law Joyce. Bert recruits a nurse Gottfriedina "Dinka" to audition. Bert decides that the love he was supposed to develop for Albert at his employer's suggestion can be deployed on Joyce.

At the next rehearsal, which took place in a spacious duplex facing Union Square, Gottfriedina and Flowers are both present. Bert talks, at length, about the killing and the killer's attempted escape and the media circus waiting for his arrest.

Bert returns for another hospital visit. At the next rehearsal, he delivers a speech giving a long metaphor comparing the serial killing to a disease. Another hospital visit follows, Joyce is discharged, we learn that Belle has been staying in a sanitarium, and another rehearsal. More extended metaphors follow, including one offering a kabbalistic version of the reflection principle, and another involving a partially explicit Turing machine, suggesting the serial killer is simply an automaton following a program. Rehearsal has reached the point of Gift being arrested and committed to the Tsimtsum Correctional Center. Upon returning home, he learns Joyce has been rushed to the hospital gain. For the first time, Bert notices Leonard is in crutches.

The story then jumps, without explanation, to the night of Pudd's execution. His last victim, Berlio, is not dead after all, and returns. The strapping down of Pudd to his gurney, the method of his death, the prison chaplain's attempt to convert Pudd, and the media's role in witnessing Pudd's execution are all emphasized in long speeches. Joyce's cancer is frequently invoked as a metaphor.

With Pudd dead, Bert is shocked to learn he may make it onto the Flowers' list provisionally. With Leonard dead, Fred, also deathly ill, is caring for Joyce. Joyce dies shortly before the world premier of the commercial, followed soon by Fred. Belle, freed by her mother's death, tries to attach herself to Samuels. And at the premier, Bert is yelled off by the investors, calling him a "commercial-killer with a vengeance."

As Bert leaves, Belle says he's just taking a breather, but Samuels says no, he's not coming back. The novel ends with a stage direction "(Exit Burt)" and simultaneously an unspecified character saying "But imagine just how nice it would have been for once to harness all the Vengeance to our very own ends."

== Reception ==
Brodsky has his immense gifts under control, and real madness is allowed to shine forth

— Edmund Carlevale, The Boston Book Review, 11/1999

While the stylistic excesses force the reader into a peculiarly tenacious reading zone, We Can Report Them is finally agreeable as it is a novel that resonates.

— Alan Tinkler, Review of Contemporary Fiction, Summer 2000, Vol. 20, Issue 2

[E]ven when the story is intelligible... it doesn't much matter, except as a sounding board for various abstract concepts.

— Kristin Eliasberg, New York Times,10/10/1999

Brodsky belongs to the avant-garde school of novelists who dispense with plot in favor of the referential possibilities of language. ... Critical opinion is divided on Brodsky's 10 previous works of fiction, and the writer has alternately been read as a brilliant prose stylist and an off-putting obscurantist. Though the comic density of his language here yields some stunning verbal pyrotechnics, it just as frequently thickens into unintelligibility.

— ?, Publishers Weekly, 9/1999

Some critics praise Brodsky, but this reviewer agrees with Charles Salzberg: "Language...is supposed to communicate, not alienate; enlighten, not confuse."

— Jim Dwyer, Cal State Chico, Library Journal, 1999
