= Chris Bachelder =

American novelist

- Born: 1971 (age 54–55); Minneapolis, Minnesota, U.S.
- Education: Virginia Tech (BA); University of Florida (MFA)
- Occupations: Author, professor

Chris Bachelder (born 1971) is an American writer and frequent contributor to the publications McSweeney's Quarterly Concern and The Believer.

== Early life and education ==
Born in Minneapolis, Minnesota, he grew up in Christiansburg, Virginia. He attended Virginia Tech (BA, 1992) and the University of Florida at Gainesville (MFA, 2002).

== Career ==
Bachelder has taught fiction writing and literature courses at Colorado College (Assistant Professor), North Carolina Governor's School West, New Mexico State University (Visiting Professor), and The University of Massachusetts Amherst MFA Program for Poets & Writers, along with Sabina Murray, Noy Holland and Anthony Giardina. He has also taught at the Sewanee School of Letters and the Governor's School of North Carolina. He currently teaches at the University of Cincinnati (Associate Professor).

Bachelder's e-book Lessons in Virtual Tour Photography was McSweeney's first career-development e-book. His most recent novel, The Throwback Special, was published by W.W. Norton and Company in March 2016 and was named as a finalist for the National Book Award.

== Bibliography ==
- Bear v. Shark (Scribner, 2001)
- Lessons in Virtual Tour Photography (e-book), 2006, McSweeney's
- U.S.! (Bloomsbury USA, 2006).
- Abbott Awaits (Louisiana State University Press, 2011). ISBN 978-0-8071-4020-8
- The Throwback Special (W. W. Norton, 2016)
- Dayswork (with Jennifer Habel; W. W. Norton, 2023)
