= Dyad (novel) =

Novel by Michael Brodsky

- Cover of the 1st edition
- Author: Michael Brodsky
- Cover artist: Chris Wise
- Language: English
- Genre: Postmodern crime
- Published: 1989 (Four Walls Eight Windows)
- Media type: Print (clothbound hardcover, paperback)
- Pages: 299
- ISBN: 978-0-941423-30-4

Dyad is Michael Brodsky's fourth novel. It is narrated by an urban lowlife known only as X—. He is hired by the dying tycoon Jamms, who wants X— to convince Jamms's estranged artist son Jim to come home, and let bygones be bygones.

The "dyad" of the title refers to two people who are linked, what Beckett called a "pseudo-couple". X—, speaking about Jim, says:

We were constructed to be polar opposites so that the story—our story—might be born.

As is clear from the above quotation, metafictional issues are present in the novel. X— makes frequent reference to the "story-mongers" and "meaning-mongers", and is constantly trying to figure out whether trivial matters that happen qualify as "incidents" or "events" or are otherwise "part of the story".

== Sources ==
Brodsky, on the copyright page, acknowledges Noël Burch Theory of Film Practice (1973), translated from Praxis du cinema (1969), for an idea that he explores in the novel.

== Plot summary ==
The novel begins with Mr. Jamms hiring X— to convince his estranged artist son Jim to return for one last visit home before Mr. Jamms dies of his just diagnosed terminal illness. X— has three qualifications: his own father died the previous winter, he once knew Jim, and he bears a strong visual resemblance to Jim.

X— finds Jim in Rhinebeck, living with Maggy and Bessy. Jim explains his refusal to see his parents, recalling a previous medical episode and extensive philosophizing. Maggy tells a little about the hostile attitude of the father's doctor, one Doctor Scotoma. Yet Jim and X— end up on a train back to Manhattan. They dine and barhop. Soon after three in the morning they encounter a policeman, and Jim offers up a photograph, apparently of his parents, an event that X— obsesses over. They then run into Joe Testic, a friend of Jim, an acquaintance of X—. At dawn, they part. X— wanders around the Financial District.

Later, while dining in a fine restaurant, one Colletti asks X— to recruit Jim for help distributing some pharmaceuticals of an unspecified nature. X— arranges a meet, and Jim refuses. Afterwards, as Jim walks away through a park, X— bashes Jim's head in with a rock, and buries him under the leaves. X— types a letter in Jim's name, claiming to take a sabbatical. X— visits Jim's residence, and picks up clothing from Maggy.

X— stays in Jim's hotel room. While Colletti is there, Joe Testic pays a visit, and recognizes Jim's clothing on X—. Colletti kills Testic, and X— helps Colletti bury the body. Two police detectives soon interrogate X— about Jim and Testic. They talk philosophy, they know Testic is dead, they suspect Jim is dead also, they encourage X— to continue in his normal business.

X— travels on business for Colletti to a Florida island. He is accosted by Testic's father, who accuses X— of the murder of his son. He is also accosted by Doctor Scotoma, who speaks very negatively about drugs. X— returns to New York, and meets with Mrs. Jamms, her own private detective, and Maggy.

Mr. Jamms dies. The private detective invites X— for another talk, which turns out to be in the company of the two police detectives who talked with X— earlier. In the end, they exonerate X—, who makes plans for another trip.

== Reception ==
This extraordinary novel ... continues Brodsky's evolution as one of the most important writers working today, and demands our attention.

— Paul E. Hutchison, Library Journal, November 15, 1989

Disbelief in the power of language to convey the experience of being is dispiriting fare, and such propositions are contentiously pressed. One wonders how long failure, unrelieved by humor or compassion, can continue as the occasion for Brodsky's art.

— Publishers Weekly, January 1, 1989

This is really a novel of the meditations that surround meditations, and an act of thought here is as every bit as imposing and important as physical behavior... Dyad is an anthem sung from an urban dump by one of those tenors who sing Bach's cantatas.

— Paul West, "Moonless Meditations", The New York Times, December 24, 1989
