= Sam Michel =

American author

- Education: University of Florida (MFA)
- Occupations: Writer professor
- Spouse: Noy Holland
- Writing career
- Subject: Fiction

Sam Michel is an American author. He is married to the writer Noy Holland. They live in western Massachusetts with their two children.

== Publications ==
He wrote Under the Light, a collection of stories, "Strange Cowboy, Lincoln Dahl Turns Five"' (Tyrant Books 2012) and Big Dogs and Flyboys, published by Southern Methodist University Press in 2007.

His fiction has appeared in The Massachusetts Review, The New York Tyrant, Epoch and elsewhere.

== Academic ==
Michel studied writing under Gordon Lish. He received a MFA degree from the University of Florida.

Michel was Writer-in-Residence at Phillips Academy (1994–1997) and has taught in the creative writing program at the University of Florida and at the MFA Program for Poets & Writers at the University of Massachusetts Amherst (UMass).
