= Landlock X =

2023 debut poetry collection by Sarah Audsley

- Author: Sarah Audsley
- Genre: Poetry
- Publisher: Texas Review Press
- Publication date: 2023
- Pages: 70
- ISBN: 978-1-68003-305-2

Landlock X is a 2023 debut poetry collection by Sarah Audsley, published by Texas Review Press. It was a finalist for the 2023 Big Other Book Award in Poetry.

== Form ==
The collection examines the experience of Korean American adoptees through forms like pastoral, ekphrasis, collage, sijo, haibun, and erasure. Visual elements, such as adoption documents, are incorporated alongside the textual.

In an interview with Tinderbox Poetry Journal, Audsley discussed how the "X" in the title represents "all the (un)known variables (and therefore consequences) of adoption." In a conversation with The Common, she described writing "into negative space" and the role of absence as shaping the ethos of the collection.

== Critical reception ==
Eleanor Wilner, writing in Ploughshares, called the poems "searing insight into the intimate, often wounding experience of a Korean American adoptee" and praised the collection's "brilliance of its formal inventions, fierce lyric power, and its unsparing candor."

The Poetry Foundation observed its combination of textual and visual elements, calling them forms of Audsley's reclamation over her Korean adoptee background.

Blackbird praised the collection's formal range and stated that "one of the joys of reading this book is the fissures one gets to momentarily be in with the author" and calling it "a delightfully disturbing read."

LEON Literary Review called it an exploration conducted "in the most multifaceted, complex, open-hearted, and probing ways I can imagine," praising Audsley's use of color as "a tool for imagination and sensory experience" and for exploring racial and adopted identity.
