= David Milofsky =

American novelist

- Born: 1946 (age 79–80); New York City, U.S.
- Education: University of Wisconsin; University of Massachusetts Amherst College of Humanities and Fine Arts (MFA)
- Occupation: Writer
- Writing career
- Genres: Fiction; non-fiction

David Milofsky (born 1946) is an American writer of fiction and non-fiction. He is the author of eight novels and two collections of short fiction: Scare Tactics, Monument and Other Stories, A Milwaukee Inheritance, Managed Care, Where I'm Living Now, A Friend of Kissinger, Playing from Memory, Eternal People and Color of Law. In addition to writing fiction, he works regularly as a journalist. His short stories, articles and reviews have appeared widely in a variety of national periodicals, including the Milwaukee Journal, the Chicago Tribune, The New York Times and The New York Times Magazine. He worked as a script editor on the National Public Radio drama project, Earplay, and has also served as editor of the literary journals Denver Quarterly and Colorado Review. He founded the Center for Literary Publishing and was the founding editor of the Colorado Prize in Poetry. Since 2002 he has written the "Bookbeat" column for The Denver Post. In 1992 he was one of the founders of the Evil Companions Literary Award, which recognizes the contributions of writers who either live in the West or write about the region.

Born in New York City in 1946, Milofsky grew up and was educated in public schools in Wisconsin. He holds degrees in English from the University of Wisconsin and the MFA Program for Poets & Writers at the University of Massachusetts Amherst. A former member of the Board of Directors of the Associated Writing Programs, he has directed writing programs at the University of Denver and Colorado State University, where he is currently emeritus Professor of English. He has also taught at Middlebury College, Iowa State University, and the University of Wisconsin. He lives in Denver with his wife.

Milofsky has won fellowships from the National Endowment for the Arts, the MacDowell Colony, and the Bread Loaf Writers' Conference. He has also been awarded the Prairie Schooner short fiction award and won the Colorado Book Award for Color of Law. He has also received a Prairie Schooner Short Fiction Award and the Colorado Book Award.

His most recent work is historical fiction set during the McCarthy era, Scare Tactics is an evocation of the red scare period. The book has been met with high literary praise and was published in October 2025 by Serving House Books.

== Bibliography ==
- Scare Tactics, 2025, Serving House Books
- A Milwaukee Inheritance, 2019, University of Wisconsin Press
- Managed Care, 2017
- A Friend of Kissinger, 2003, University of Wisconsin Press
- Color of Law, 2000, Univ Pr of Colorado
- Playing from Memory, 1999, Univ Pr of Colorado
- Eternal People, 1998, Univ Pr of Colorado
