= *** (novel) =

Novel by Michael Brodsky

- Cover of the 1st edition
- Author: Michael Brodsky
- Cover artist: Mark Beyer
- Language: English
- Genre: Postmodern literature
- Published: 1994 (Four Walls Eight Windows)
- Publication place: United States
- Media type: Print (clothbound hardcover, paperback)
- Pages: 367
- ISBN: 978-1-56858-000-5

*** (pronounced "three asterisks") is the fifth novel by Michael Brodsky, published by Four Walls Eight Windows in 1994. The book centers on Stu Potts, working for Dov Grey, captain of industry, creating ***s out of raws. Although "***" and "raw" occur frequently in the text, their meanings are never explained.

== Plot summary ==
The novel opens with a 13-page section consisting almost entirely of paragraphs that begin "It all began with ...". These paragraphs include some simple one-liners (including "bathroom smells, bathroom noises", "hunger, and thirst of course", "the loss of his credit cards") any one of which could start a typically written novel, but here do not. They also include longer paragraphs, including some that look like they might have something to do with ***. For example, one paragraph starts by mentioning that Stu was very much liked by his fellow tenants (Mr. Bresson, Mr. Dostoevsky, Mr. Balzac, Mr. Xman). But being captioned very much liked was so terrible that Stu needed "a manly atmosphere, heady with *** work, to cure him of this pathos." Another paragraph says that the beginning was when Stu felt he was one in an assembly line of listeners, each bound to repeat the story to the next listener.

The story properly begins with Stu Potts attending a party hosted by Bette Kaye, noted for when "Dov Grey became Dov Grey." Prominent among the attendees are Dov Grey and his wife Gwenda, employee Jomm Dawrson and his wife Tullshie (also called Miss Tullshie Dawrson née Dreadnought). Dov and Jomm share their hostility to the popular Hinkle-Winkle, who is "the eternal embodiment of goodish news," and a "freeloading ... world-class houseguest." In contrast, their wives are sympathetic to Hinkle-Winkle and his associates, "a band of brotherly strugglers all, unhierarchizable sodality of free souls." Later it is revealed that Gwenda's sister Trendy is "wife and, depending on the time of day, concubine" to Hinkle-Winkle.

Stu is hired by Dov, engaged in housecleaning. After six months, (Note: p. 107.) Stu hates his job, and long philosophical conversations with Jomm do not help. Along the way, Stu takes a break walking outside, where he is confronted by the receptionist, Ms. Redmount. He ignores her, and interprets street activity as incomplete transformation of raw into ***.

The next day, Dov dictates to Redmount, now his private secretary, while they make love, witnessed by Stu and Jomm over a glass partition. Soon after, Stu listens in on Jomm and Dov discussing Gwenda, raws, and ***s. (Note: pp. 91–102) Gwenda then has Stu in for his six-month review.

== Reception ==
Sarah Lyall in The New York Times wrote ahead of publication that Brodsky's decision to title the novel *** "does present its own difficulties". The novel was reviewed by Brian Evenson in Review of Contemporary Fiction, Scott L. Powers in the Boston Globe, and Judith Upjohn in American Book Review, as well as in Publishers Weekly and Library Journal.
