= Franciscan Missionary Sisters of the Immaculate Heart of Mary =

The Franciscan Missionary Sisters of the Immaculate Heart of Mary were founded by Mary Catherine Troiani in 1868 in Cairo, Egypt. They are now established in fifteen countries. Their "...work includes service in clinics, hospitals, orphanages and the education of girls and young people.”

== Early life in the monastery ==
Costanza Troiani was born in the Roman suburb of Giuliano on January 9, 1813. When she was only six, her mother died in a domestic accident. Troiani was then entrusted to the care of the nuns of St. Clare of Charity in the Monastery of Ferentino. She drew inspiration from reading works of hagiography (Note: There are many hagiographical works known as The Lives of Saints [in Italian: Vite di Santi]. (See Lives of the Saints (disambiguation), for examples.) Sources do not specify which Troiani read, but she may have had access to Acta Sanctorum or works based on this, such as Butler's Lives of the Saints.) and periodicals describing the life of the missionaries. At the age of 16, she felt a vocation to be a member of the small monastic congregation which had raised her and she was quickly accepted and given the name, Sister Mary Catherine of St. Rose of Viterbo. Shortly after her religious profession, she was named as secretary of the monastery and of the abbess. Her prayers and work then supported the abbess in their efforts to help the development of their small religious congregation, which was struggling to follow a more strictly cloistered life.

Thoughts of working in the foreign missions, however, never left her mind. It was at this time in her life that Joseph Modena became the confessor to the nuns of the monastery (1851). Modena had recently returned from a period of missionary service in Alexandria, Egypt. While there, he had learned from the apostolic delegate to that nation about the great need for education among the children of that country. He sought to find religious sisters to fill this need and spoke to various monasteries in search of volunteers. The community in Ferentino chose to support his quest and to send some of the nuns to Egypt.

Several years of preparation were spent seeking the various approvals needed from both ecclesiastical and civil authorities for such a step. Finally, all permissions had been received, a house in Cairo had been purchased through the help of a relative of Troiani, thus a party of six nuns set out for Egypt, led by the abbess herself. They arrived in Cairo on September 14, 1859 and immediately set about gathering children to teach and going out among the poor to care for the sick. Troiani worked to establish houses for orphans. The sisters soon learned Arabic to make their mission effective. Troiani provided much of the leadership of the new foundation, due to the poor health of the abbess. In the Chapter of 1863, she herself was elected as abbess, and from that time was addressed as Mother Mary Catherine.

It was at this juncture that the monastic community in Ferentino chose to withdraw from its support of the mission. Faced with either returning to Italy or closing a mission that was just beginning to flourish, she and her companions decided to separate from their monastic congregation. They chose to re-organize under the Rule of the Third Order of St. Francis and received formal approval of the Holy See on November 10, 1868, under the name of the Franciscan Missionary Sisters of Egypt.

== Sisters of Cairo ==
Immediately after receiving the approval of the new congregation by Pope Pius IX, Troiani and nine members of the original community made profession of religious vows under the new rule. They were joined by nine new novices in taking the new habit. Around 1869, Mother Catherine made a pilgrimage to the Holy Land and decided to establish a convent in Jerusalem. Soon new missions were founded throughout Egypt, and then abroad, in Milan, and Malta and. The work of the congregation developed under Troiani's leadership for nearly two decades, until she fell ill while in Cairo during Eastertide 1887. She died there the following May 6. Troiani was beatified by Pope John Paul II in 1985.

== The congregation today ==
The congregation is now called the Franciscan Missionary Sisters of the Immaculate Heart of Mary. The work of the sisters continued to spread through the continent of Africa, expanding to West Africa, and then to both North America and to South America as well as to Asia. In 2019, the community celebrated the 100 anniversary of the establishment of the Province of the Child Jesus in the Holy Land. The sisters of the province work in Jerusalem, Bethlehem, Tiberias, Nazareth, Haifa and Cana.

As of 2013 there were some 600 Sisters serving in 15 countries on 5 continents.
