= Guth =

Guth is a surname. Notable people with the surname include:

- Alan Guth (born 1947), American cosmologist
- Alfred Guth (1908–1996), Austrian-born American water polo player, swimmer, and Olympic modern pentathlete
- Allison Guth (born 1981/2), American basketball coach
- Amy Guth, American radio host and writer
- Bucky Guth (born 1966), American baseball player
- Charles Guth (1876–1948), American businessman
- Charlie Guth (1856–1883), American baseball player
- Claus Guth (born 1964) German theatre director, focused on opera
- Dana Guth (born 1970), German politician
- Dennis Guth (born 1955), American politician
- Eugene Guth (1905–1990), Hungarian-American physicist
- Fernand Guth (1926–1977), Luxembourgish footballer
- Henk Guth (c.1921–2003), Dutch artist
- Jean Baptiste Guth (1883–1921), French painter and illustrator
- John Guth (born 1981), American poker player
- Joseph P. Guth (1860–1928), American architect
- Larry Guth (born 1977), mathematician
- Louis D. Guth (1857–1939), American businessman and politician
- Mara Guth (born 2003), German tennis player
- MK Guth (born 1963), American installation artist
- Paul Guth (1910–1997), French humorist and writer
- Raymond Guth (1924–2017), American film and television actor
- Rodrigo Guth (born 2000), Brazilian footballer
- William Westley Guth (1871–1929), American attorney, Methodist minister, and academic
