= Garielle Lutz =

American writer (born 1955)

- Born: October 26, 1955 (age 70); United States
- Occupations: assistant professor, University of Pittsburgh at Greensburg
- Writing career
- Genres: short story, essays

Garielle Lutz (born 26 October 1955) is an American writer of fiction. In 2021, simultaneous with the publication of her book Worsted, Lutz came out as a transgender woman. In 2022, she was twice mentioned as an unlikely contender for the Nobel Prize in Literature.

== Career ==
Lutz was an assistant professor of English at the University of Pittsburgh at Greensburg, but is now retired.

A collection of her short fiction, Stories in the Worst Way, was published by Alfred A. Knopf in November 1996 and re-published by 3rd Bed in 2002 and Calamari Press in 2009. Lutz's second collection of short stories, I Looked Alive, was published by the now-defunct Four Walls Eight Windows in 2003 and republished by Black Square Editions/Brooklyn Rail in 2010. Partial List of People to Bleach, a chapbook of new and early stories (published pseudonymously as Lee Stone in Gordon Lish's The Quarterly) was released by Future Tense Books in 2007. Divorcer, a collection of seven stories, was released by Calamari Press in 2011. Her work has appeared in Sleepingfish, NOON, The Quarterly, Conjunctions, Unsaid, Fence, StoryQuarterly, The Believer, Cimarron Review, 3rd Bed, Slate Magazine, New York Tyrant, The Anchor Book of New American Short Stories, The Apocalypse Reader (Thunder's Mouth Press), PP/FF: An Anthology (Starcherone Books), The Random House Treasury of Light Verse and in the film 60 Writers/60 Places.

== Awards and recognitions ==
Lutz received a literature grant from the National Endowment for the Arts in 1996, and a grant from the Foundation for Contemporary Arts in 1999.

== Publications ==
=== Fiction ===
- Stories In the Worst Way (1996 from Alfred A. Knopf; 2002 from 3rd Bed; 2009 from Calamari Press)
- I Looked Alive (2003 from Four Walls Eight Windows; 2010 from Black Square Editions/Brooklyn Rail)
- Writer's Digest Grammar Desk Reference, with Diane Stevenson (2005 from Writer's Digest Books)
- Partial List of People to Bleach (2007 from Future Tense Books)
- Divorcer (2011 from Calamari Press)
- The Gotham Grammarian (2015 from Calamari Press) Online Version
- Assisted Living (2017 from Future Tense Books)
- The Complete Gary Lutz (2019 from Tyrant Books)
- Worsted (2021 from Short Flight/Long Drive Books)
- Backwardness (2024 from Hobart Pulp)

=== Online texts ===
Short Fiction:

- "Backwardness"
- "She Who Is Still Within Reach"
- "I Must Have Always Felt Elevated"
- "Eminence" Archived 2007-09-28 at the Wayback Machine
- "For Food"
- "Ventriloque"
- "I Used to Love LPs"
- "Contractions"
- "Devotions"
- "Esprit de L'Elevator"
- "Street Map of the Continent"
- "SMTWTFS"

Review:

- "Fatal Agreement: The new edition of The Chicago Manual of Style wrestles with grammar." (Slate, August 2003)
- A review of Life of a Star by Jane Unrue (The Believer, June 2010)

Essay:

- "The Sentence Is a Lonely Place" (The Believer, January 2009)
- ("The Poetry of the Paragraphs: Some Notes") (3am Magazine, August 2016)

=== Interviews ===
- with Blake Butler, Vice
- with Diana George, The Stranger
- with Justin Taylor, Bookslut
- with Ross Simonini, Believer Magazine
- with Michael Kimball, The Faster Times
- with Gene Kwak, We Are Champion Archived 2010-09-14 at the Wayback Machine
- with David Winters, "3:AM Magazine"
- with Dylan Nice, "Wag's Revue"
- with Greg Gerke, Big Other
- with Elizabeth Ellen, Hobart Pulp
