= Mark Beyer (artist) =

American cartoonist (born 1950)

- Born: October 8, 1950 (age 75)
- Known for: Cartoonist
- Notable work: Comics featuring Amy and Jordan

Mark Beyer (born October 8, 1950) is a self-taught American artist and former cartoonist. His comics were known for their bleak story lines, often featuring death, disfigurement, depression, and humiliation, which contrasted with his self-taught, geometric drawing style. Most of his stories were about the adventures of a codependent yet resentful couple named Amy and Jordan. Beyer made one final comic strip for the summer 2012 issue of the British magazine ArtReview.

== Biography ==
Beyer is originally from Allentown, Pennsylvania in the Lehigh Valley region of eastern Pennsylvania. He is a self-taught, outsider artist whose work has appeared in Raw Vision magazine.

Beyer's work was prominently featured in all but two issues (#3 and 4) of Raw magazine. He has also been published in New York Press and New Musical Express. Beyer also had a recurring animated short series on MTV's Liquid Television (The Adventures of Thomas and Nardo); and a 1995 movie by Gregg Araki, The Doom Generation, was loosely based on the Amy and Jordan strips.

He has also produced cover artwork, including Xman and *** by Michael Brodsky, T-shirts and posters for John Zorn and the New York Downtown avant-garde music scene. In particular the cover and inserts for Zorn's tribute to Ornette Coleman Spy vs Spy (1989) and a popular Naked City T-shirt.

Although he mostly works solo, Beyer has collaborated with writer Alan Moore.

== Books ==
- A Disturbing Evening and Other Stories. Allentown, PA: Mark Beyer, 1978. OCLC 36752209.
- Manhattan. New York: Raw Books, 1978.
- Dead Stories. Allentown, PA: Mark Beyer, 1982. OCLC 37763474.
  - Dead Stories. Sudbury, MA: Water Row Press, 2000. ISBN 0-934953-72-4.
- Agony. New York: Raw Books, 1987. ISBN 0-394-75442-5.
  - Agony. New York: New York Review, 2016. ISBN 9781590179819.
- Agony. Augsburg: MaroVerlag, 1992. German translation.
- Amy + Jordan. Paris: Sketch Studio, 1993.
- Amy + Jordan. Augsburg: MaroVerlag, 1996.
- We're Depressed. Sudbury, MA: Water Row Press, 1999. ISBN 0-934953-65-1.
- Amy and Jordan. New York: Pantheon, 2004. ISBN 0-375-42270-6.
  - Amy and Jordan. Paris: Camboukaris, 2013. ISBN 9782366240238.

== Zines ==
This list may not be complete.

- Mark Beyer. Death. PA: Mark Beyer, 1980.
- Mark Beyer. Amy and Jordan at Beach lake. PA: Mark Beyer, 1983.
- Mark Beyer and Emilia Brintnall. Pain Parade. Edition of 250. (Note: Description of Pain Parade at a retailer.)
- Mark Beyer. Pooooo. Liancourt: CBO Éditions, 1996. Edition of 150.
- Mark Beyer. Lost Faces. Zürich, 2000. Edition of 350.
- Gary Panter and Mark Beyer. Panter versus Beyer. Liancourt: CBO Éditions, 2003. Edition of 100. OCLC 907799569.
- Mark Beyer. Ne'er-do-wellers. Trapset Zines, 2017. Edition of 200. (Note: Description of Ne'er-do-wellers by its publisher.)
- Mark Beyer. 2016–17. Marseille: Le Dernier Cri, 2017. Edition of 500. (Note: Description of 2016–17 by its publisher.)
