= Spy vs Spy (album) =

Studio album by John Zorn
- Released: 1989
- Recorded: August 1988
- Studio: Power Station, New York City
- Genre: Avant-garde jazz; free jazz; punk jazz; thrashcore
- Length: 40:32
- Label: Elektra/Musician
- Producer: John Zorn

John Zorn chronology
| News for Lulu (1988) | Spy vs Spy (1989) | Filmworks VII: Cynical Hysterie Hour (1989) |

Spy vs Spy: The Music of Ornette Coleman is the fifth studio album by American composer and alto saxophonist/multi-instrumentalist John Zorn, featuring the compositions of Ornette Coleman performed in the brief, intense style of Zorn's hardcore miniatures. Alongside Zorn are fellow alto saxophonist Tim Berne, bassist Mark Dresser and drummers Joey Baron and Mike Vatcher.

The liner notes thank Ornette and Denardo Coleman, Mick Harris (of Napalm Death), Ted Epstein (of Blind Idiot God), Pil (of Lip Cream- a Japanese thrashcore group), The Accused, Craig Flanagan, DRI, CBGB, and "the New York-London-Tokyo Hardcore Triangle". The cover artwork was created by indie comics artist Mark Beyer (of Amy and Jordan fame). The album itself approaches “free” jazz from the perspective of hardcore punk, particularly taking note of the contemporary innovations of thrashcore and grindcore. Zorn would later pursue these preoccupations in the thrash jazz group Naked City.

Like some classic free jazz albums (Free Jazz, Ascension, Archie Shepp's Mama Too Tight), different saxophonists improvise simultaneously in stereo. Tim Berne appears on the left stereo channel, while John Zorn is represented on the right channel.

== Reception ==
Professional ratings
Review scores
| Source | Rating |
|---|---|
| AllMusic | 3.5/5 stars |
| The Penguin Guide to Jazz | 3.5/4 stars |

The AllMusic review by Scott Yanow stated: "The performances are concise with all but four songs being under three minutes and seven under two, but the interpretations are unremittingly violent. The lack of variety in either mood or routine quickly wears one out".

The album was included in the book 1001 Albums You Must Hear Before You Die.

== Track listing ==
All compositions by Ornette Coleman.

| No. | Title | Length |
|---|---|---|
| 1. | "W.R.U." | 2:38 |
| 2. | "Chronology" | 1:08 |
| 3. | "Word for Bird" | 1:14 |
| 4. | "Good Old Days" | 2:44 |
| 5. | "The Disguise" | 1:18 |
| 6. | "Enfant" | 2:37 |
| 7. | "Rejoicing" | 1:38 |
| 8. | "Blues Connotation" | 1:05 |
| 9. | "C. & D." | 3:05 |
| 10. | "Chippie" | 1:08 |
| 11. | "Peace Warriors" | 1:20 |
| 12. | "Ecars" | 2:28 |
| 13. | "Feet Music" | 4:45 |
| 14. | "Broad Way Blues" | 3:42 |
| 15. | "Space Church" | 2:28 |
| 16. | "Zig Zag" | 2:54 |
| 17. | "Mob Job" | 4:24 |

== Personnel ==
- John Zorn - alto saxophone
- Tim Berne - alto saxophone
- Mark Dresser - bass
- Joey Baron - drums
- Michael Vatcher - drums
