= Sabina Murray =

Filipina-American screenwriter and novelist

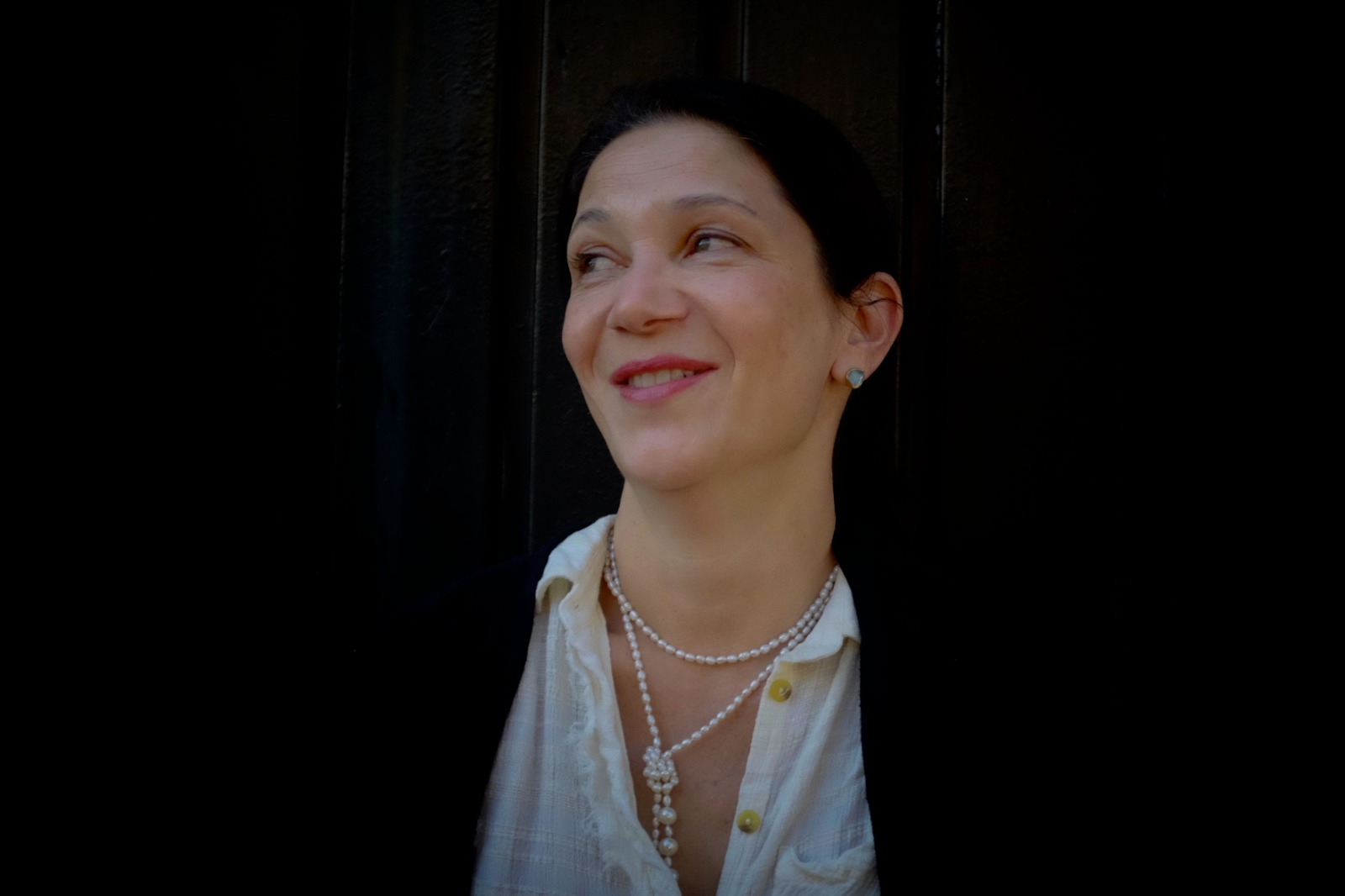
- Murray in 2019
- Education: Mount Holyoke College (BA); University of Texas at Austin (MA)
- Occupations: Screenwriter; novelist

Sabina Murray is a Filipina-American screenwriter and novelist. She currently is a professor in the MFA Program for Poets & Writers at the University of Massachusetts Amherst.

== Background and career ==
The daughter of an American father and a Filipina mother, Murray grew up in Australia, Pennsylvania, and the Philippines. She received her B.A. in art history from Mount Holyoke College in 1989 and her M.A. in English and creative writing from the University of Texas at Austin in 1994. She also completed post-graduate study in fiction from the University of Texas at Austin in 1994. She has previously been a Roger Muray Writer-in-Residence at Phillips Academy (Andover, Massachusetts) and was published in Ploughshares, Ontario Review, and the New England Review. She was also the fiction judge for the Drunken Boat's First Annual Panliterary Awards.

Murray currently lives in western Massachusetts, where she is on the fiction faculty at University of Massachusetts Amherst (along with Jeff Parker, Edie Meidav and Noy Holland). She is on the editorial board of the literary magazine The Common, based at Amherst College.

== Awards and fellowships ==
- Several major awards, including the PEN/Faulkner Award for Fiction (2003).
- A Carnivore's Inquiry, was named a "Best Book of the Year" by The Chicago Tribune.
- Fellowship from the Michener Center at The University of Texas, Austin
- Bunting fellowship from the Radcliffe Institute for Advanced Study.
- Nominated for the Best First Screenplay Award (Independent Spirit Awards 2005)
- Guggenheim Fellowship 2007

== Screenplays ==
- The Beautiful Country (2004) (Terrence Malick, Nick Nolte, Bai Ling)

== Books ==
- Slow Burn (Ballantine Books, 1990)
- The Caprices (Mariner Books, 2002) - stories
- A Carnivore's Inquiry (Grove/Atlantic, 2004)
- Forgery (Grove/Atlantic, 2007)
- Tales Of the New World (Grove/Atlantic, 2011) - stories
- Valiant Gentlemen (Grove Atlantic, 2016) - a historical novel based on Irish revolutionary Roger Casement's friendship with Herbert Ward and his wife, Sarita Sanfor
- The Human Zoo (Grove/Atlantic, 2021)
- Muckross Abbey and Other Stories (Grove/Atlantic, 2023)
