= Michael Hafftka =

American painter

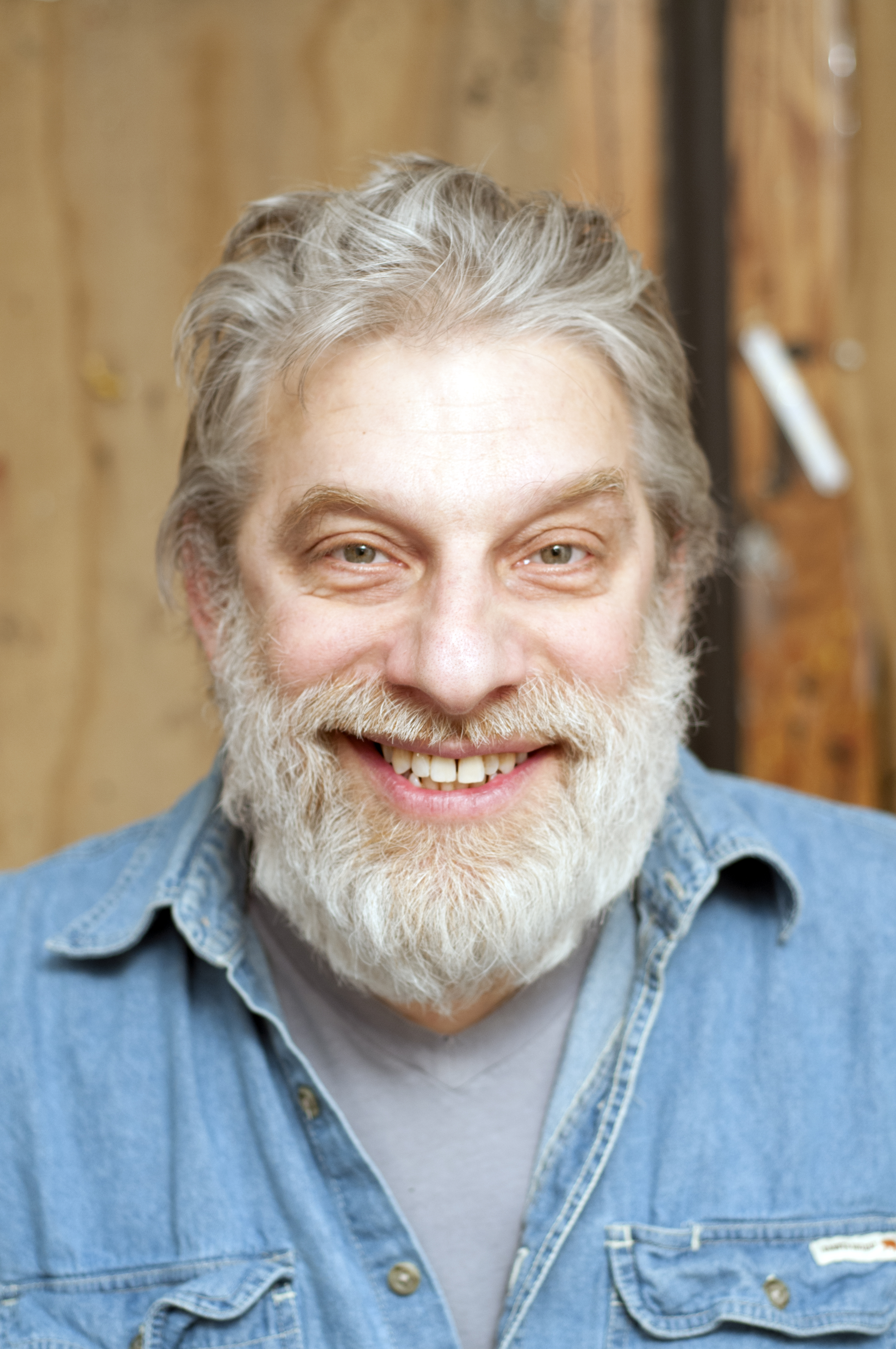
Michael Hafftka 2014

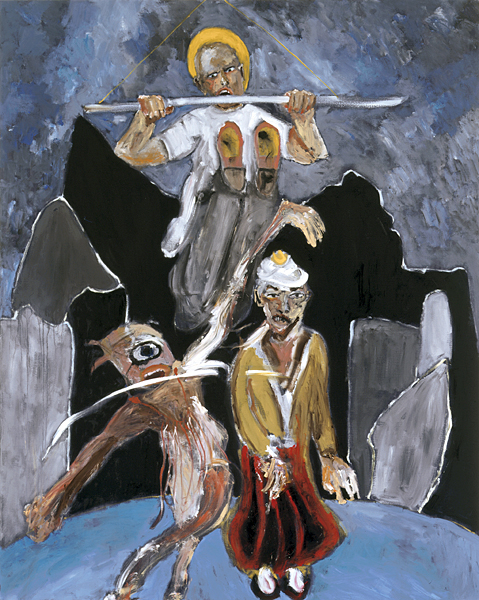
"Leap of Faith," o/c, 78 x 62 in. (198 x 157.5 cm), by Michael Hafftka, 1998

Michael Hafftka is an American figurative expressionist painter living in New York City. His work is represented in the permanent collections of a number of museums, including: The Metropolitan Museum of Art, New York Museum of Modern Art, Brooklyn Museum of Art, San Francisco Museum of Modern Art, Carnegie Museum of Art, New York Public Library, McNay Art Museum, Housatonic Museum of Art, Arizona State University Art Museum, National Gallery of Art, and Yeshiva University Museum.

Hafftka was born in Manhattan (1953) to Eva and Simon Hafftka, European refugees and Holocaust survivors. He was raised in the Bronx and attended public schools.

Hafftka designed covers for Urizen Books, including Detour, Wedding Feast and Circuits, by Michael Brodsky. Kevin Begos of Guignol Books published Hafftka's drawings in 1982.

His first one-person show was at Art Galaxy. Among the New York galleries that subsequently have featured his work are: the Rosa Esman Gallery, the Aberbach Gallery, the Mary Ryan Gallery, and the DiLaurenti Gallery. He has also exhibited widely in the United States and abroad.

The Housatonic Museum of Art mounted a retrospective in October 2004.

Yeshiva University Museum at the Center for Jewish History in New York held a solo exhibition I of the Storm, a major show of recent works, March through August 2009.

== Illustrated Books ==
- Conscious/Unconscious, short stories and drawings by Michael Hafftka, Six Gallery Press 2007, ISBN 978-0-9781772-9-4
- In the Penal Colony, a short story by Franz Kafka illustrated by Michael Hafftka, Limited Editions Club 1987, ASIN B003Y7OW8W
- The Terror of Loch Ness, a novel by Che Elias, illustrated by Michael Hafftka, Six Gallery Press 2007, ISBN 978-0-9782962-0-9
- Circular Stairs, Distress in the Mirrors, poems by Peter Klappert with art by Michael Hafftka, Six Gallery Press 2008, ISBN 978-0-9810091-1-7
- To Die Next To You, poems by Rodger Kamenetz with art by Michael Hafftka, Six Gallery Press, 2013, ISBN 978-1-9266165-0-6

== Digital Publications ==
- My Declaration of Independence and how I see it as an artist in a decentralized ecosystem, a blog post by Michael Hafftka, January 24, 2023
- Hafftka Computer Paintings 1996-98, a blog post by Michael Hafftka, March 1, 2023
