= Detour (Brodsky novel) =

Novel by Michael Brodsky

- First edition cover
- Author: Michael Brodsky
- Cover artist: Michael Hafftka
- Language: English
- Genre: Postmodern literature
- Published: 1977 (Urizen Books)
- Media type: Print (clothbound hardcover)
- Pages: 359
- ISBN: 978-0-916354-82-4

Detour is the debut novel of Michael Brodsky. It is the first person partly autobiographical account of an often bored film devotee going to Cleveland for medical school, making observations on everything in his daily life, either in a philosophical manner, or by comparing any given incident with some classic film scene, or both. Halfway through, the narration is interrupted by Steve's story, also told in first person. The novel eventually resumes with the original first person narrator, who finally decides medical school is not for him.

== Editions ==
Detour was republished in 1991 by Begos & Rosenberg, with a 1991 copyright, and no indication of any earlier edition, yet textually identical with the 1977 edition.

Detour was republished in 2003 by Del Sol Press, in an expanded, rewritten edition.

== Reception ==
Michael Brodsky is a brilliant writer. I find more affinity with him than with any other recent American novelist.

— Peter Handke, dust jacket

This is an extraordinary and artistically rigorous novel .... [Brodsky] is a master both of technique and of language, his sentences positively crackling with unexpected insights.

— ?, Publishers Weekly

Brodsky's a comer, chockablock with high intentions and nerve.

— ?, Kirkus Reviews

The real protagonist is language: adventures occur, not to people, but to metaphors and images.

— Scott Sanders, Chicago Sun-Times

It should be obvious to serious readers ... that Brodsky ... is a sensitive, original, and insightful writer, one of the best produced by this country in the last 30 years.

— Harvey Pekar, Village Voice, "An American Revisionary", 8/19/2003
