= Pamela Ryder =

American writer (born 1949)

- Born: 1949 (age 76–77)
- Occupation: Writer
- Website: www.pamelaryder.com

Pamela Ryder (born 1949) is an American writer. Ryder is the author of Correction of Drift: A Novel in Stories (Fiction Collective 2), A Tendency to Be Gone: Stories (Dzanc Books), and Paradise Field: A Novel in Stories (Fiction Collective 2). Her fiction has also been published in many literary journals, including Black Warrior Review, Conjunctions, Prairie Schooner, The Quarterly, Shenandoah, and Unsaid. Ryder was the recipient of a 2024 National Endowment for the Arts Fellowship in Creative Writing.

== Selected works ==
- Correction of Drift: A Novel in Stories (Fiction Collective 2, 2008), ISBN 978-1573661423

Regarding Correction of Drift, Irving Malin writes: “I have tried to explicate the remarkable results of Ryder's language—it is, after all, the real mystery. She has moved into poetic metaphor and she makes us feel the romantic, brutal, visionary points of view she offers subtly. It is language itself—with its ability to inflect, affect, reflect the narrative. I congratulate Ryder for her stunning achievement” (Hollins Critic, October 1, 2009).

Anna Leahy at The Huffington Post writes: “While the subject matter—the Lindbergh kidnapping—connects the individual parts of Correction of Drift, the reader is set adrift in relation to timeframes, narrators, and many other aspects of fiction upon which we usually rely. That said, this book taught me how to read adrift. The most obvious technique Ryder uses to reorient the reader to this different style is excerpts from newspapers and other documents in between the sections” (The Huffington Post, April 4, 2013).

- A Tendency to Be Gone: Stories (Dzanc Books, 2011), ISBN 978-0976717768

“If A Tendency to be Gone is difficult,” Robert Glick writes, “it is not because its lyrical, punning, and inquisitive sentences are complex, or because its stories do not prioritize character or plot, but because the collection uses language in simultaneously unfamiliar and repetitive ways that force a reexamination of how we use specific vocabularies to engage with the material world. In the opening story, ‘Hovenweep,’ the first-person narrator's relationship with her (presumably) partner is exposed and complicated by his unceasing technical denotation of the land's formations, its rocks and branches. “‘Basalt,’ he says, ‘Apache’s tears,’ and ‘travertine,’ and names hard things. But sandstone is what this canyon is—wind-scoured, river cut and carved, leached through and leaving behind the buttes and mesas, the solid buttresses that fall to pieces in a breeze.” This passage gives us Ryder’s lyrical prose through specific vocabularies: a defamiliarized language used by the narrator to learn and relearn, to gain access to the actual material signified” (American Book Review, Vol. 34, # 2, January/February 2013 p. 30).

- Paradise Field: A Novel in Stories (Fiction Collective 2, Summer 2017)

=== Other writing ===
- “Ark”
- “The Renoir Is Put Straight”
- “Overland”
- “Daybreak Birdsong Always Wakes Him: The Lives of Billy the Kid”
