= The Caprices =

Short story collection by Sabina Murray

First edition (publ. Mariner books)

The Caprices is a short story collection by Sabina Murray. The stories are set in the Pacific theatre of World War II. It received the 2003 PEN/Faulkner Award for Fiction.
