= Xman =

Book by Michael Brodsky

- Cover of the 1st edition
- Author: Michael Brodsky
- Cover artist: Mark Beyer
- Language: English
- Genre: Postmodern literature
- Published: 1987 (Four Walls Eight Windows)
- Media type: Print (clothbound hardcover, paperback)
- Pages: 539
- ISBN: 978-0-941423-01-4 (hc); 978-0-941423-02-1 (pb)

Xman (sometimes referred to as XMAN) is Michael Brodsky's third novel. It tells the parody philosophical tale of Xman, a universal nobody who arrives in Manhattan and drifts between arguments, interviews, accidents, hospitals, derelicts, terrorists, and death.

Xman is noted for its lack of conventional characters or dialogue. The plot is picaresque. Ontological discussion is the norm, especially in regard to symptoms, labels, captions, bracketing, impersonation, and the true work.

Xman was described as a "highly regarded avant-garde novel", an example of what small presses are capable of.

== Plot summary ==
Of Xman's background, we learn he was born an oversized orphan in Eunuque Falls, Iowa, a suburb of Old Balls, raised in an orphanage outside of Cincinnati, and ended up in the city C or C— some time before the novel begins. Xman had minutes of experience in podiatry school, after which he worked on a construction gang in the Berkeley hills.

Xman, seeking to make himself unique, takes a cab to the airport, flies to New York City, then rides a bus to Grand Central Station. He walks up Second Avenue, sometimes giving derelicts a few cents. He finds the hotel his friends recommended, the Microtraumata Royale. Taking a room, he listens to an argument in the room next door between Fatima "Fa", and a man that Xman dubs (-)Xman.

Jed Perlmutter introduces Xman to Jensen MacDuffers, who wants to introduces him to Tom McTomTom, but instead directs him to Amos and Alphonse Finaglie, who run an employment agency high up in the World Trade Center. Rose Baldachino handles Xman's case. While addressing Xman, Rosalie walks in with a folder for Rose. Xman moves in with Rosalie. He gets a temporary job, working for Fish, who delivers, before Xman has actually done anything, a long speech on the quality of Xman's work and work habits, interrupted by the arrival of Brunhildine. When she leaves, Fish continues his speech, including the story of Brunhildine, and how she's trapped.

Next, Xman works for Mitch Rollins. Then Rose B. calls with work for Xaviero, which requires impersonation on Xman's part. He is given an assignment involving patients and one Doctor von der Schmücke. To clear his mind, Xman went for a walk near the marina, and overheard Gottfied and Xaviero, who eventually revealed themselves to Xman. Xaviero tells Xman that all he had told Xman about disease was wrong, since they believed their conversation was being tapped by Fatima Buck.

Next day, dodging Fish, arrives at his assignment with Xaviero and Gottfried, who deny meeting Xman the night before. They introduce Xman to Dr. Q., who talks on about symptoms and patients. Xman takes off for his lunchbreak to see Rollins in his new office. Rollins criticizes Xman for looking for raw material in the wrong way, so he tells Xman the story of Z, the great creator, who would throw himself into the "disaster of the everyday."

Subdued, a more docile Xman returns the next day to Xaviero. In the waiting room is Dr. Quixot with a lady patient. Dr. Quixot takes out a medical brochure he received from Xaviero, and proceeds to criticize it, but Xman delivers a rousing speech on impersonation, and tells Xaviero he is leaving, he needs something "consecrated to the destruction—on a grand scale—of all professions." He continues speechifying, culminating in a demand the right labels. As he exits, quitting, he hears Xaviero deny they use labels in any form.

Xman returns home, anxious over his unemployment, and is unable to control his temper with Rosalie. They head out together and meet the taxi driver from C— who had driven Xman to the airport. He credits Xman for inspiring him to come to New York City. Xman and Rosalie return, and continue to argue. Eventually Xman returns to Xaviero, listens to Xaviero's speech, and gives up again. He goes home to Rosario, gives up again, walks around, and is hit by a truck.

Xman recuperates in B— —B— —B— —Hospital, where he is visited by Rose, MacDuffers, and Perlmutter. They talk. Several days later, Rosalie shows up to take him home to their new apartment, out on "a little island in the East River." No progress in their relation is made, and Xman returns to Rose, who tells him she has no jobs, but instead tells him about Pman, a former job seeker with their agency, who closely resembles Xman. The story of Pman ends inconclusively, and Rose tells Xman to give up his search for "the true work", and to settle for "a symptom". She calls the truck accident a suicide attempt.

Xman leaves, and wanders around Manhattan, debating on whether Rose is correct. He ends up listening to a soapbox orator who reminds Xman of (-)Xman, lecturing on "The Age of the Symptom", seemingly tailor-made for Xman (for example, "sometimes we are ready to throw ourselves in front of a truck"), culminating in the "Story of the Man and of the Bench". Certain that he has to get to Park, he hurries along, hoping to be hit in exactly the same manner, and is suddenly interrupted in his dream-like thoughts.

Xman wakes up in a hospital. The nurse and the doctor are talking about Xman, trying to interest him in their project. The nurse is Fatima, she leaves, the doctor tells him she had been here to see Xaviero McShayne, who had just expired. The doctor leaves, Rosalie shows up, with her just-born infant. Rosalie and baby leave, and Fatima and the doctor return, and they speak, mostly Fatima telling her story, trying to recruit Xman. She ends by telling Xman there is a paid-for room waiting for him in a hotel near Times Square, and a check for his immediate needs.

Running around lower Manhattan, Xman, now frequently referred to as Xman von Dungen, at some point notices he has a pursuer, and after failing to shake him, ends up sharing a cafe table with him. After long conversation, Xman agrees to attend the offered terrorist cell meeting, led by Fatima. The pursuer, known as "The Lieutenant", gives a speech on the benefits of working with Fatima. Along the way, we learn the Lieutenant's is known as Siegfried, nickname Ziggy, real name Mahatma, commonly abbreviated S/M.

Speeches over, Xman goes wandering through Manhattan again, ends up to see Rosalie and he hopes his child. She tells him "it's too late," and reads to their child the story of a very poor Caucasian woodcutter, Sven, his wife, Yekaterina Ivanovnanookna, and their seventeen strapping sons. The point of the story is that things are over between Rosalie and Xman, and so he leaves.

Wandering around he sees a few Arabs leave a car, shoot two people, then drive off. Xman continues to wander, spots Fatima, follows her into a movie theater, sits down by her. Fatima asks Xman what he thought of the Arabs, and discusses her terrorism. After annoying the other patrons with their conversation, they leave for a coffee shop, continuing their conversation. They end up at the hotel near Times Square, with more of Fatima's group. Eventually, Xman is assigned to work with Gunhildo né Grigorevitch, and they blow up a bridge next day, timed for a prominent slumlord's crossing. At his next meeting, Xman is told to go away for a while. He pays another visit to Rosalie and their child. When he leaves, Xman feels he is advancing toward death, and this secret makes him feel infinitely strong.

With the others, Xman attends the funeral of the slumlord. Xman finds that death is what he's looking for: "captionless and devoid of symptomal content.". During a eulogy, Siegfried throws Xman a sawed-off shotgun, who fires, first at Fatima, then the others. Chaos breaks out, Xman himself is shot, he throws a bomb, and dies.

== Reception ==
At its best, Xman brings the reader to reflect anew on ways of knowing and truths of being in an uncertain world

— Harry Marten, "Here Comes Nobody", New York Times, 1987

Xman's trek is through a forest of urban symbols, and the only way out—aside from slamming the cover and retreating into the sky above the tangled passages—is to stay to the end. It is not easy going

— Stewart Lindh, "Let the Unknown Be X", Los Angeles Times 11/22/1987

As metaphors compound and sentences unwind around the questions of reality and response, Brodsky creates a novel of stunning impact. He uses his "Everyman" to explore and explode the urban world and in doing so explodes the novel form itself, piling up images in a flowing narrative that invades characters to find the story within the story. Contemporary fiction at its most robust; highly recommended.

— Paul E. Hutchison, Library Journal, 1987
