= Lives of the Saints =

Lives of the Saints may refer to:

- Hagiography, a biography of a saint or an ecclesiastical leader

== Books ==
- Lives of Saints (Ælfric) a 10th-century series of homilies by Ælfric of Eynsham
- Lives of the Saints (Skarga), a 1570s Polish book
- Butler's Lives of the Saints, a 1750s English collection by Alban Butler
- The Lives of the Saints (Baring-Gould), an 1870s English collection
- Lives of the Saints (Lemann novel), a 1985 novel by Nancy Lemann
- Lives of the Saints (Ricci novel), a 1990 novel by Nino Ricci
- The Lives of the Saints (Berridge short story collection), a 1995 collection by Edward Berridge

== Films ==
- Lives of the Saints (miniseries), a 2004 TV miniseries
- The Lives of the Saints, a 2006 film starring Emma Pierson

== See also ==
- Acts of the Saints
