= The Man Who Fell in Love with the Moon =

1991 book by Tom Spanbauer

- Cover of the 1991 U.S. market edition
- Author: Tom Spanbauer
- Language: English
- Genre: Western, LGBT literature
- Publisher: Morgan Entrekin
- Publication date: 1991
- Publication place: United States
- Media type: Print (Hardback & Paperback)
- Pages: 368
- ISBN: 0-8021-3663-X
- OCLC: 43973660

The Man Who Fell in Love with the Moon is a 1991 novel by American author Tom Spanbauer set at the beginning of the 20th century. Told primarily in flashback by its protagonist, a biracial Native American named Out-In-The-Shed ("Shed" for short), most of the action occurs in the late 19th century in the fictional town of Excellent, Idaho, as Shed grows up, learns about his parents, and falls in love. The work is Spanbauer's second novel.

== Plot synopsis ==
Duivichi-un-Dua, also known as Out-in-the-Shed or just "Shed", is a biracial bisexual who lives in the fictional town of Excellent, Idaho, in the middle part of the 20th century.

In flashback, Shed reveals that in the 1880s he lived with his mother, a Shoshone Indian, and that his mother worked as a maid, laundress, and prostitute for no-nonsense but tender-hearted madam Ida Richilieu at Richilieu's hotel and brothel. The two live in a shed in the rear of Ida's place. Although Shed's mother will not speak about his father, Shed believes his father was a mentally ill cowboy named Billy Blizzard (who had been sexually involved with Shed's mother since Blizzard was 13 years old). Blizzard goes insane, raping the teenaged Shed. Shed's mother tries to hunt down her son's rapist, but Blizzard kills her. Ida Richilieu takes Shed on, so long as Shed acts as a prostitute for Richilieu's customers. Shed agrees.

After a few years, Shed decides to discover more about his father and heritage. He leaves Excellent and tries to find his mother's tribe. On the way there, he meets Dellwood Barker, a Montana cowboy who introduces Shed to a variety of spiritual and mystical traditions. The two begin a relationship. After finding a photograph of his mother among Barker's possessions, Shed comes to believe that Barker is his father. Barker soon sends Shed on his way to the Shoshone tribe, not wishing to hinder Shed in his quest. Shed finds his mother's tribe living on a reservation, and meets the Shoshone medicine man, Owlfeather. Shed learns the true meaning of his name, but shortly thereafter is shot by Owlfeather's son, Charles Smith. Smith commits suicide moments later, and Owlfeather breathes life back into Shed (dying in the process).

After recovering, Shed sheds his Indian identity, considering it killed by Charles Smith, and he returns to Excellent. A new and beautiful prostitute, the widow Alma Hatch, has joined the brothel, and, after Dellwood Barker appears in town, the four individuals form a tightly bonded group that share living quarters and sexual experiences. But the town has changed as a number of Mormons have moved to Excellent, and the town's libertine ways are going away. After some time, the four African American Wisdom brothers (Homer, Blind Jude, Ulysses, and Virgil) arrive in Excellent. Disagreement between the Mormon settlers and Ida Richilieu and her friends breaks out and descends into arson (the brothel is burned down, killing several of their friends) and murder (the four Wisdom brothers are killed). In the period after this tragedy, Ida Richilieu, Dellwood Barker, Alma Hatch, and Shed try to break out of their depression by consuming all the opium and alcohol they can get their hands on. In a haze, Ida Richilieu and Alma Hatch attempt to go over nearby Devil's Pass in a blizzard, but their wagon overturns on a steep hill. Alma dies, and Ida's legs are frozen up to the knees. Dellwood Barker and Shed go after the women. They rescue Ida, but Shed and Dellwood are forced to amputate her legs to save her life. Dellwood Barker goes insane from the shock surrounding this rapid turn of events, and leaves Excellent to die. The Mormons now hold Excellent in their grasp. Shed learns more about his heritage, but the world he knew is gone.

The book concludes with the elderly Shed reflecting on how little has changed in Excellent since the death of Alma Hatch, and how the white people of Excellent are not in touch with their true selves.

== Writing the novel ==
Author Tom Spanbauer was born in Idaho and raised on a farm there, and Spanbauer drew heavily on his upbringing for settings in the book.

After graduating from Idaho State University in 1969 with a bachelor's degree and then spending two years as a Peace Corps volunteer in Kenya, Spanbauer married and returned to Idaho where he obtained a job at his alma mater as a counselor and advisor to the student Indian Club. He met and became involved with Clyde Hall, a two-spirit (and later a tribal elder) Shoshone-Métis. Three months later, the two became blood brothers. Hall had a deep influence on Spanbauer that directly led to the writing of The Man Who Fell in Love with the Moon:

...Clyde Hall put my feet on the ground, and when I looked at the ground I saw that it was my mother. Clyde helped me to see the world was alive and full of mystery. He pretty much took me out of my Christian European culture head and helped me see that I wasn’t separated from nature. That by stepping into my body, I stepped into nature. ... [T]he thing I want to impress on you the most, is my life and his came together in such a way that kind of blew us both out of the water. Speaking for myself, I could never have written The Man Who Fell In Love With The Moon without Clyde, or any of the rest of my books.

Spanbauer moved to New York City in 1983 and entered the Columbia University Writing Program. Spanbauer took a job as an apartment building supervisor in the East Village, and began abusing alcohol and taking cocaine. He began writing The Man Who Fell in Love with the Moon in 1987, and by 1988 was deep into the manuscript. The writing process was a very difficult one for Spanbauer. He had so little money that he lived like "a subway rat, pale and frail, trying hard to believe in" the novel he was writing. He later said, "A lot of the stuff I came up with was pretty fearsome, facing some personal devils head-on. I couldn't distinguish between the world and the book. At one point, I was so stressed out, I passed out in Penn Station." As he told the Seattle Post-Intelligencer after the book's publication, "It's all a matter of trust. You're right in the middle of this story. You don't know the end of it. It's this preposterous tale about these preposterous people, and you don't know what's going to happen next, and you're tired of eating chicken livers and fettuccine, and you're alone in this little square concrete apartment, there's no air or earth, and pretty soon it was hard for me to distinguish what was going on in my head and what was going on on the outside." The book took four and a half years and seven revisions to complete.

In one memorable sequence in the book, the cowboy drifter (and both men believe, Shed's father), Dellwood Barker, has anal sex with Shed and teaches Shed about the "Wild Moon Man"—an anthropomorphic representation of neotantric sex and expanded orgasm. According to Spanbauer, the idea for the Wild Moon Man came out of his own imagination:

The Hairy Moon Man came out of my very own dirty little mind. I think it may be based on the archetype of the puer, or Eternal Boy. I hooked up the puer with Narcissus and I got a pool of water. And inside the pool of water is the exact opposite of the fine sensitive boy. The dark side of the fine puer who wants to be pulled down to the darkest place and have his asshole ravished by the hairy beast. Those of us who have made this journey under water, or to the other side—to the under world and back—have an awareness, and a responsibility to the rest of the world to tell the story.

Completing the manuscript did not occur until early 1991 and left Spanbauer emotionally and physically exhausted, so he moved to Oregon to recuperate.

== Style ==
The Man Who Fell in Love with the Moon is a book in the "dangerous writing" style of fiction actively promoted by author Tom Spanbauer. According to Spanbauer, this is a style of writing which is deeply personal and which directly addresses issues difficult to confront for the author. He explains: "Dangerous writing means putting a piece of yourself in a work, going to the 'sore spot,' and discussing taboo topics, particularly sex and violence. It means writing for yourself, a concept that in the literary world was thought to make you go broke. It means exposing yourself to the tiger, not physically, but mentally." The book also features a writing style Spanbauer calls "going on the body". As author Chuck Palahniuk, a student of Spanbauer's, has explained: "Story can be a succession of tasty, smelly, touchable details. What Tom Spanbauer and Gordon Lish call 'going on the body,' to give the reader a sympathetic physical reaction, to involve the reader on a gut level."

Critics have also observed elements of magic realism in the novel.

== Critical reception ==
The Man Who Fell in Love with the Moon was very well received when it was published in 1991. The Washington Post called it "amazing" and "dazzlingly accomplished" and The Oregonian said the novel "boldly creates a new voice from the Old West." The New York Times was equally effusive: "The miracle of the novel is that it obliges us to rethink our whole idea of narration and history and myth." The Los Angeles Times found it "brave, original, ribald, funny, [and] heart-rending" and concluded that the book is "as bright as it is dark, full of fictional and philosophical pleasures, a quirky, unsettling look at American history and a vision quest in the grand old tradition." The book's extensive cast of quirky characters was singled out by several reviewers. The Washington Post said the characters were "winningly rebellious...brimming with life", while the Seattle Post-Intelligencer said "Spanbauer has populated his pages with characters so colorfully drawn they practically pop off the page and start dancing, egged on by mass consumption of whiskey, locoweed and opium stardust." Reviewers compared Spanbauer to Mark Twain, D. H. Lawrence, Gabriel García Márquez, Garrison Keillor, Thomas Berger, Walt Whitman, William H. Gass, Molly Gloss, and Russell Hoban.

The novel received some critical comments as well. The Oregonian's reviewer thought the characters were too "extreme," felt that the narrative took too long to get going, and concluded that Shed's method of communicating in sentence fragments (often missing a verb or subject) difficult to comprehend. Nevertheless, while these elements were "irritating", the reviewer concluded: "[T]he exasperation is worth it: There is something triumphant about a novelist who risks this much and manages to find his way home." The same reviewer also found that some passages might make some readers queasy: "Spanbauer's book, his second novel, is not for the squeamish (or Mormons without a sense of humor). The descriptions of love-making and violence done to the flesh are pretty graphic. Shed is a clear-eyed, unflinching observer, after all; and if someone is going to have her legs amputated, Shed is going to report the dismembering in detail. That makes sense in terms of the character, but it can be heavy going for the sensitive." The Los Angeles Times' critic noticed a resemblance between Spanbauer's novel and other novels from several years earlier which attempted to shock with sex and violence, and wondered whether the novel was "irresponsible" in the age of AIDS.

Despite the generally excellent reviews, by 1999 the Chicago Tribune had called the novel "unjustly obscure". The Los Angeles Times felt the book fell short of "cult" status because it came 20 years too late to be part of the free love and gay liberation movements.

The book's status, and Spanbauer's reputation as an author, have both risen rapidly in the last 10 years. One reviewer noted that "Spanbauer made his mark" as an author with the novel. Robert Walter, director of the Joseph Campbell Foundation, quoted a portion of the novel as some of the best American writing in 1993. By 2001, the novel had reached "cult" status. One journalist called the work "an acknowledged minor classic".

The book made two "best of" lists since it was published. In 1999, the Boston Phoenix announced it was the 88th best LGBTQ novel of the 20th century. An organizer for the United Kingdom's Big Gay Read, a follow-up to The Big Read, noted that The Man Who Fell in Love with the Moon was the one book that should be added to the first-cut list.

== Awards ==
The Man Who Fell in Love with the Moon was a finalist for the 1992 Stonewall Book Award, a prize sponsored by the American Library Association and the oldest LGBT book award in the United States. The book won the Pacific Northwest Booksellers Association Award.
