= Dear Mr. Capote =

1983 novel by Gordon Lish

- First edition cover
- Author: Gordon Lish
- Publisher: Henry Holt & Co
- Publication date: January 1, 1983
- ISBN: 978-0-030-61477-4

Dear Mr. Capote is a 1983 novel by Gordon Lish. His first novel, it takes the form of a letter to Truman Capote from a serial killer, "Yours Truly", who wishes Capote to write his biography, and share the proceeds.
