= Andrew Ervin =

American author, critic and editor

- Born: 1971 (age 54–55); Media, Pennsylvania, U.S.
- Education: Goucher College (BA); Illinois State University (MS); University of Illinois Urbana-Champaign (MFA)
- Occupation: Writer
- Spouse: Elivi Varga
- Website: andrewervin.com

Andrew Ervin (born 1971) is an American writer whose debut 2010 novella collection Extraordinary Renditions (Coffee House Press) was selected by Publishers Weekly as one of the Best Books of 2010. His 2015 debut novel Burning Down George Orwell’s House (Soho Press) was listed as an Editor's Choice in the New York Times Book Review. He currently lives in Philadelphia.

== Biography ==
Andrew Ervin was born in Media, Pennsylvania. He has lived in Budapest, Hungary, Illinois, and Louisiana and now resides in Philadelphia, Pennsylvania. He is married to the flutist Elivi Varga.

== Education and career ==
Ervin holds a BA in Philosophy and Religion (Goucher College), an MS in English (Illinois State University) and MFA in Fiction (University of Illinois at Urbana-Champaign). He served as the inaugural Southern Review Resident Scholar at Louisiana State University. He was previously the Kratz Writer-in-Residence at Goucher College and a 2016-2017 Digital Studies Fellow at Rutgers University-Camden. He teaches part-time for the Honors Program and the MFA program in creative writing at Temple University as well as for the Interactive Games and Media department at Rochester Institute of Technology.

As a fiction writer, his short stories have appeared in the literary journals Conjunctions, Fiction International, The Southern Review, Another Chicago Magazine, Monkeybicycle and Golden Handcuffs Review. His fiction has been included in the anthologies Chicago Noir (2005), Mythtym (2008), Topograph (2010), and Gigantic Worlds (2014).

His story The Light of Two Million Stars in Conjunctions issue 53 was listed among the “distinguished submissions” in Best American Short Stories 2010, edited by Richard Russo.

Selections of his fiction appear online at Hobart, Significant Objects, Revolver and Journal of Compressed Creative Arts.

His first book was a collection of novellas, Extraordinary Renditions, published in 2010. Publishers Weekly included the book on its list of the “Best Books of 2010.” It was also a long-list finalist for The Story Prize

Ervin's debut novel Burning Down George Orwell's House was published in 2015 by Soho Press. Parisian publishing house Éd Joelle Losfeld/Gallimard released the novel's French translation. in 2016.

As a critic, Ervin has published hundreds of book reviews and essays in USA Today, New York Times Book Review, The Believer, Philadelphia Inquirer, Washington Post, San Francisco Chronicle, Miami Herald, Chicago Tribune, Boston Globe, American Book Review and elsewhere. Selections of his critical essays can be found online at Salon, The Rumpus, Conversational Reading and Publishing Perspectives.

His first book-length work of criticism Bit by Bit: How Video Games Transformed Our World, a combination of history, criticism, and personal experiences relating to video games, was published by Basic Books in May 2017.

As an editor, Ervin interned at the publishing houses Dalkey Archive Press and FC2. He guest edited two issues of American Book Review and one of nonfiction for an issue of Hobart. He has worked at the literary magazines Monkeybicycle, Ninth Letter and The Southern Review.

== Published works ==
Novel

- Burning Down George Orwell’s House (Soho Press, 2015), ISBN 978-1616954949

Novellas

- Extraordinary Renditions: 3 Novellas (Coffee House Press, 2010), ISBN 978-1566892469

Criticism

- Bit by Bit: How Video Games Transformed Our World (Basic Books, 2017), ISBN 978-0465039708
