= Tom Spanbauer =

American writer (1946–2024)

- Born: June 30, 1946; Pocatello, Idaho, U.S.
- Died: September 21, 2024 (aged 78)
- Education: Columbia University
- Occupation: Author
- Writing career
- Years active: 1989–2024

Tom Spanbauer (June 30, 1946 – September 21, 2024) was an American writer whose work often explored issues of sexuality, race, and the ties that bind disparate people together. Raised in Idaho, Spanbauer lived in Kenya and across the United States. He later lived in Portland, Oregon, where he taught a course titled "dangerous writing." He graduated in 1988 from Columbia University with an MFA in Fiction and wrote five novels.

== Biography ==
Spanbauer was born and raised in Pocatello, Idaho. As a gay writer, Spanbauer explored issues of race and sexual identity, and stated on his website that his work also addressed "how we make a family for ourselves in order to surmount the limitations of the families into which we are born." Spanbauer's childhood in Idaho influences his writing. He attended Idaho State University and Columbia. He was also a member of the Peace Corps in Kenya.

Spanbauer was the creator of the concept of dangerous writing, a technique he taught with the philosophy outlined below:

"It is a terrifying thing to bring your inner life out of the closet and read it aloud to a group... Because I encourage excellence, and each of us has our own excellent, and excellence only comes with not being afraid of who you are. To learn to speak your truth honestly with a clear voice takes lots of practice, and every trick in the book to keep you going down the arduous, cruel, lonely, glorious path of a writer."

Dangerous Writing focuses on a minimalistic style and "writing from the body," the act of overcoming fear to write painful personal truths. According to Spanbauer, approximately forty of his students have published memoirs and novels.

Spanbauer died from heart failure on September 21, 2024, at the age of 78. He had also been suffering from Parkinson's disease for eight years.

== Works ==
- Faraway Places (1989)
- The Man Who Fell in Love with the Moon (1991)
- In The City Of Shy Hunters (2001)
- Now Is The Hour (2007)
- I Loved You More (2014)

Volume 1 of The Quarterly, published in the 1987 spring edition, featured Spanbauer's "Sea Animals."

Spanbauer's novels are written in first person and connected to the author's personal life; in an interview with Judy Reeves for San Diego Writers, Ink, Spanbauer said:

"There's something very troubling inside me, something that won't let me go. It's tossing me about and I am in fear and I am helpless. When I finally sit down to look at this thing that scares me, I make myself a deal to tell the truth no matter what. I write one paragraph and my narrator breaks the deal and begins to lie. There are no rules except that I can't forsake my original intention. To find that hidden thing [that is] driving me nuts."

His novels The Man Who Fell in Love with the Moon, Now is the Hour, and Faraway Places take place in his home state of Idaho. With In the City of Shy Hunters, Spanbauer breaks this pattern, setting much of the action in New York. His last novel I Loved You More hopscotches back and forth from Idaho to New York, San Francisco, and Portland, Oregon, all places where Spanbauer has lived and worked.

In Faraway Places, Spanbauer's first novel, young Jake Weber witnesses the murder of a Native American woman and is forced to reevaluate the community he was raised in. This coming of age story was hailed by A. M. Homes as "a family drama with a pitch perfect crescendo." The Los Angeles Times stated that "in his promising but uneven first novel, a coming-of-age story set in the early 50s, Tom Spanbauer writes convincingly as a teen-age boy bewildered by events that destroy his family's rural life."

The Man Who Fell in Love with the Moon was a finalist for the 1992 Stonewall Book Award. Stephen Dubner, writing for New York Magazine, describes the novel as "a sprawling tragicomedy set in a gold-rush town called Excellent, Idaho. Shed, who is definitely bisexual and most likely mixed race, shares time, beds, and whiskey bottles with a pair of loving, flamboyant prostitutes and a soulful rancher who might be his father. The book is equal parts bizarre Bildungsroman, raucous picaresque, and hard-driving wild-West yarn." In keeping with the thread of autobiography that runs through his novels "by the time his first novel was published ... in 1988, Spanbauer had already descended into Shed's twisted world, where morality, sexuality, and race are gigantic question marks," and he admits to going to "a very, very dark place" while writing The Man Who Fell in Love with the Moon.

In the City of Shy Hunters follows Will Parker from the Northwest to New York, where the specter of AIDS looms large. Salon Magazine's Peter Kurth reminds the reader that Spanbauer's "fiction, while riding on conventional coming-of-age, coming-to-terms, coming-out plots, is unlike any you've read or are likely to read before this epidemic ends. Yes, AIDS provides the thematic backdrop of In the City of Shy Hunters. Yes, Spanbauer himself was diagnosed with 'full-blown' AIDS in 1996. But In the City of Shy Hunters is so finely crafted, Spanbauer's characters so true to life, the New York City he remembers from the early days of the plague so exactly captured in its 'unrelenting' mess and glory, you'll think you've been reading a modernist classic by the time you're through, rather than the latest entry in an artificial, post-post genre." Publishers Weekly called it "a big, brazen, histrionic work of fiction."

Now is the Hour returns to the bildungsroman arcs of earlier Spanbauer novels, opening as young Rigby John leaves his small town behind for San Francisco. Entertainment Weekly favored the novel, writing this review:

"This coming-of-age story charts teenager Rigby John Klusener's hilarious and poignantly painful experiences in a small Idaho farming town before his flight for San Francisco in 1967. If Tom Spanbauer's too-choppy succinctness and propensity for using four-letter cusswords as entire paragraphs initially feel awkward, Now is the Hour eventually settles into a comforting rhythm and warmhearted intimacy. And the author's narrative choice has purpose, vividly reflecting Rigby's shame for playing dress-up, rage at his strict Catholic family, and confusion over a nonsexual relationship with his girlfriend. The emotional complexity of Rigby's entertaining arc only makes one yearn to read about the San Francisco chronicles that surely follow."

Although criticized from some corners as following a commonplace plot, Now is the Hour has been praised for its "strikingly beautiful writing… even the one climactic moment of violence is tender and dreamlike."

I Loved You More is the first of Spanbauer's novels to address his personal struggle coping with HIV and AIDS, as well as male bisexuality, through the looping narrative of main character Ben Grunewald. Lambda Literary Foundation gave I Loved You More a positive review, closing with this statement:

"A clumsier writer would clutter up a story about a gay man simultaneously in love with a 'straight' guy and a woman with denial and angst; Spanbauer simply unpacks imagery, events, and dialogue without judgment, allowing the reader to come to their own conclusions. If anything, I Loved You More provides an empathic view of bisexual relationships as the most natural in the world, perhaps the most generous expression of love and shared strength for the survival of humanity."
