= Michael Brodsky =

American writer

- Born: August 2, 1948 (age 78); New York City, United States
- Occupations: Novelist, Editor
- Writing career
- Notable works: Xman, ***
- Literary movement: Postmodernism
- Website: webdelsol.com/4Walls8Windows/Michael_Brodsky

Michael Mark Brodsky (born Aug 2, 1948) is a scientific/medical editor, novelist, playwright, and short story writer. He is best known for his novels Xman and ***, as well as for his translation of Samuel Beckett's Eleuthéria.

== Early life and education ==
Michael Brodsky was born in New York City, the son of Martin and Marian Brodsky. He attended the Bronx High School of Science. He received a 1969 BA from Columbia College, Columbia University, taught math and science in New York for a year, attended Case Western Reserve University medical school for two years, then taught French and English in Cleveland until 1975.

Brodsky returned to New York City in 1976, working as an editor for the Institute for Research on Rheumatic Diseases. He married Laurence Lacoste. They are the parents of two children, Joseph Matthew and Matthew Daniel. From 1985 to 1991, Brodsky was an editor with Springer-Verlag. After 1991, he was with the United Nations.

Brodsky lives on Roosevelt Island.

== Bibliography ==
=== Novels ===
- Detour, 1978
- Circuits, 1983
- Xman, Four Walls Eight Windows, 1987
- Dyad, Four Walls Eight Windows, 1989
- ***, Four Walls Eight Windows, 1994
- We Can Report Them, Four Walls Eight Windows, 1999
- Lurianics, Gray Oak Books, 2013
- Invidicum, Tough Poets Press, 2023

=== Short stories ===
- Wedding Feast, 1981
- Project, 1982
- X in Paris, 1988
- Three Goat Songs, 1991
- Southernmost, 1996
- Limit Point, 2007

=== Plays ===
- Terrible Sunlight, 1980
- Packet Piece, 1982
- No Packet Piece, 1982
- Dose Center, 1990
- Night of the Chair, 1990
- Six Scenes: A Barracks Brawl, 1994
- The Anti-Muse, reading 1996, performance 2000

=== Translation ===
- Eleuthéria, by Samuel Beckett, written 1947, suppressed, published 1995

=== Nonfiction ===
- "Svevo: The Artist as Analyzand", Review of Existential Psychology and Psychiatry, 15 no. 2-3 (1977), pp 112–133.
- "Toward the Plane of the Sacred: Hafftka’s Great Chain of Being" essay in the catalogue for Michael Hafftka "A Retrospective: Large Oils 1985-2003" (2004).
