= The Common (magazine) =

American literary magazine

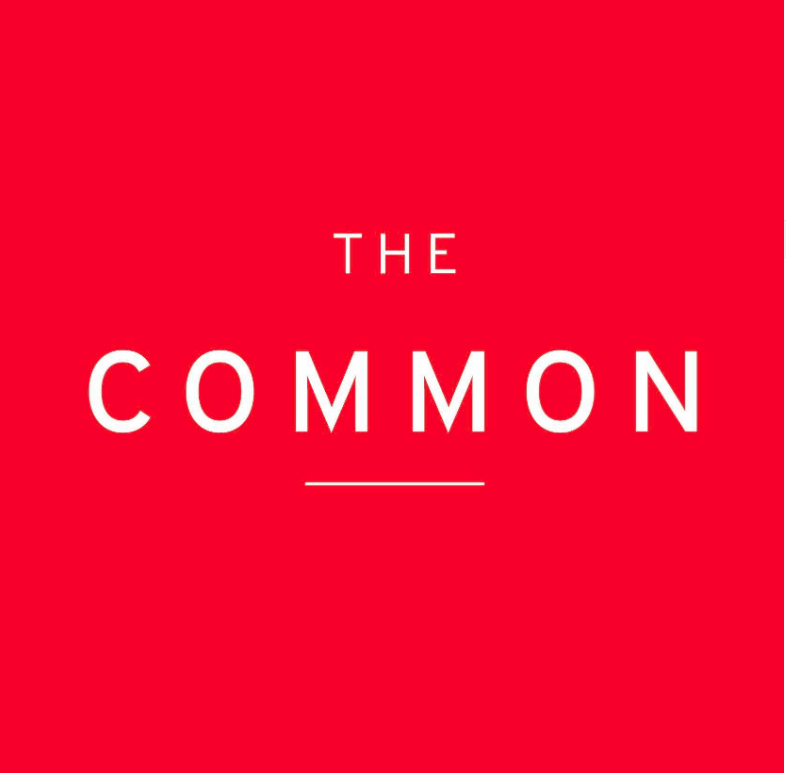
- Discipline: Literary magazine
- Language: English
- Edited by: Jennifer Acker

Publication details
- History: 2011–present
- Publisher: The Common (United States)
- Frequency: Biannual

Standard abbreviations
- ISO 4: Common

Indexing
- ISSN: 2160-1216

Links
- Journal homepage

The Common is an American nonprofit literary magazine founded in Amherst, Massachusetts, by current editor-in-chief Jennifer Acker. The magazine, which has been based at Amherst College since 2011, publishes issues of stories, poems, essays, and images biannually. The Common focuses its efforts on the motif of "a modern sense of place", and works to give the underrepresented artistic voices a literary space.

== History ==
The magazine's prototype issue, 00, was published in October 2010. In early 2011, Jennifer Acker obtained an investment from Amherst College as a literary magazine focused on the motif of place in fiction, poetry, nonfiction, and visual arts. The magazine is published by The Common Foundation, a 501(c)(3) nonprofit organization. At the magazine's inception, Amherst College provided an on-campus office, a website, funding for start-up costs, and the budget for a staff of student interns. One former student employee, Diana Babineau, became a full-time employee of the magazine, as its managing editor under Acker. Since 2016, Emily Everett has worked as the managing editor of The Common. The College hosts the magazine's offices in its Robert Frost Library.

The Common's partnership with Amherst College extends beyond administration. The English Department, Creative Writing Center, and student-run prose and poetry magazine Circus have all collaborated with The Common in the past for events, public readings, book fairs, and writing workshops. Additionally, some professors at the College, including William Pritchard and Pulitzer Prize-winner Richard Wilbur, have served on the editorial board. Since the magazine's founding, Jennifer Acker has periodically worked as a professor at the College, teaching some of The Common's pieces, for example. With this support, The Common launched its first issue, 01, in April 2011. It has since published a total of 31 issues as of April 2026.

== Content and Editors ==
The Common has published new fiction by Lauren Groff, Fiona Maazel, Sabina Murray, and Teresa Svoboda, essays by Sarah Smarsh, W. Ralph Eubanks, and Susan Straight, and poems by Rafael Campo, Don Share, Honor Moore, Bob Hicok, Fatimah Asghar, David Lehman, J. D. McClatchy, John Freeman, and Mary Jo Salter. The magazine has featured art by Rico Gatson and Martha Rosler. Its prototype issue included a piece by Jim Shepard. The magazine has also published the work of debut writers, poets, and photographers. Beyond the biannual issues, the magazine publishes literary features online, all freely available to the public. The website includes interviews, a fledgling podcast series, called Contributors in Conversation, a monthly recommendation of books from the authors and staff of The Common, called "Friday Reads", Dispatches, short missives written by contributors evoking a particular sense of place, and other features not published in the print editions.

== Critical responses and awards ==
In 2014, the magazine's first year of eligibility, the National Endowment for the Arts awarded The Common an Art Works Grant. Other authors and writers, whose works have not been included in The Common, have praised the magazine and some of the stories it has published. The Best American Series, whose editors have included Dave Eggers, Denise Duhamel, Cheryl Strayed, Elizabeth Strout, and Mark Doty, has named particular The Common issues and stories as belonging to their top lists of prose, poetry, and essays between the years 2012 and 2014. The 26th Annual New York Book Show recognized The Common Issues 01 and 02, earning the magazine a second place literary magazine design award. Other contributors to The Common have had their work featured by Longform, Literary Hub, and Utne Reader. Others have won prizes from PEN America, New England Poetry Club, Craft Literary, O. Henry Award 2017, and the Pushcart Prize. The journal's editorial vision and design has also been praised in The New Yorker, The Boston Globe, Slate, The Millions, Orion Magazine, and The Chronicle of Higher Education. The magazine has been nominated for the CLMP Firecracker Award three times. In 2019, The Common received the Literary Magazine Prize from the Mrs. Giles Whiting Foundation.
