= Lives of the Saints (Lemann novel) =

1985 novel by Nancy Lemann

- Author: Nancy Lemann
- Language: English
- Publisher: Alfred A. Knopf
- Publication date: 1985
- Publication place: New York
- Pages: 144 (first edition)
- ISBN: 0-394-54445-5
- Dewey Decimal: 813.54
- LC Class: PS3562.E4659L5

Lives of the Saints is a 1985 novel by Nancy Lemann. Set in the author's native New Orleans, it follows Louise Brown, also from New Orleans, who has returned home after four years at a college in the northeast. The plot mainly focuses on Louise's growing relationship with a young Southern gentleman named Claude Collier. The novel was published by Alfred A. Knopf, now a division of Penguin Random House. Lemann's first novel, the book won the author "a few stellar reviews and a following of people who prize fiction's subtler qualities".

Upon its initial publication, the New York Times printed a positive review in which the book is described as "a dense, musically patterned novel, in which repetitions of scenes, images and phrases – varied by mood and time – acquire a cumulative power" and "a finely etched picture of the South … a lyrical prose poem about a young woman’s coming of age".

The novel was reissued in 2026 by NYRB Classics.
