= Amy and Jordan =

Comic book by Mark Beyer

Amy and Jordan (Pantheon, 2004) is a comic book by Mark Beyer, featuring a dysfunctional couple who are victimized by each other and by blind circumstance. The characters Amy and Jordan appear in other works by Beyer, including Agony and Dead Stories in the magazine Raw (New York: Pantheon, 1987). It was listed in Time magazine's "Best Comix of 2004".
