= Nancy Lemann =

American novelist (born 1956)

Nancy Elise Lemann (born February 4, 1956) is an American novelist and nonfiction writer. Her work is associated with New Orleans and Southern literature, and often features digressive narration, comic repetition, social decay and characters drawn from the upper-class and bohemian circles of Louisiana. She is best known for her debut novel, Lives of the Saints, first published in 1985, and for The Ritz of the Bayou, a nonfiction account of the federal trial of Louisiana governor Edwin Edwards.

After several of her books fell out of print, Lemann received renewed attention in the 2020s when Lives of the Saints was reissued by New York Review Books, Hub City Press reissued The Ritz of the Bayou, and New York Review Books published her novel The Oyster Diaries in 2026.

== Early life and education ==
Lemann was born in New Orleans, Louisiana, on February 4, 1956, to Thomas Lemann, a lawyer, and Barbara Lemann. She earned a Bachelor of Arts degree from Brown University in 1978 and a Master of Fine Arts degree from Columbia University in 1984.

== Career ==
Lemann's first novel, Lives of the Saints, was published by Alfred A. Knopf in 1985. The novel is set in New Orleans and follows Louise Brown, a young woman who returns home after attending college in the Northeast and becomes involved with Claude Collier, a Southern aristocrat from a declining family. Kirkus Reviews called the book "a sociological and very funny portrait" of New Orleans society and described it as a comic novel about love, loss and the cultural memory of the South.

Her second book, The Ritz of the Bayou, was published in 1987. Unlike her other early books, it was nonfiction. The book grew out of Lemann's reporting on the 1985–1986 federal trial of Louisiana governor Edwin Edwards on charges involving fraud, bribery and racketeering. Publishers Weekly described the book as an account of Louisiana political and judicial culture as much as a trial narrative.

Lemann returned to fiction with Sportsman's Paradise, published by Knopf in 1992. The novel is a sequel to Lives of the Saints and follows Storey Collier, a New York City columnist connected to the Louisiana family at the center of Lemann's earlier fiction. Her later novels included The Fiery Pantheon, published in 1998, and Malaise, published in 2002. Malaise was based on a weeklong online diary Lemann wrote for Slate about her life in San Diego.

After Malaise, Lemann published shorter pieces in literary magazines, including The Paris Review. In 2026, New York Review Books published The Oyster Diaries, her first novel in more than two decades. The novel follows Delery Anhalt, a woman from New Orleans living in Washington, D.C., and returns to characters and themes from Lemann's earlier work.

== Style and themes ==
Lemann's fiction is closely identified with New Orleans and with the social codes, eccentricities and decline of old Southern families. Critics have described her work as comic, digressive and mannered, with an emphasis on repetition, social observation and emotional breakdown. In The New Yorker, Brandy Jensen wrote that Lemann's work is marked by "repetition, lyrical phrasing, and a keen eye for human folly."

The 2026 revival of Lemann's work led critics to reassess her fiction as part of a tradition of Southern comic writing. Reviewers compared her work to that of Walker Percy and noted her recurring attention to New Orleans as a place shaped by memory, social performance and decay.

== Personal life ==
Lemann lives in Chevy Chase, Maryland. Her brother is writer and academic Nicholas Lemann.

== Works ==
- Lives of the Saints (1985)
- The Ritz of the Bayou (1987)
- Sportsman's Paradise (1992)
- The Fiery Pantheon (1998)
- Malaise (2002)
- The Oyster Diaries (2026)
