= Michael Hickins =

American novelist (born 1961)

Michael Hickins (born May 1, 1961) is an American fiction writer, journalist, and news editor. He works at Oracle Corp. as director of strategic communications, and used to be as an editor at the Wall Street Journal and founding editor of CIO Journal. His debut work, The Actual Adventures of Michael Missing, was published in 1991 and featured a cover design by Chip Kidd. Kirkus Reviews called the anthology "a strange collection" and "a weird and unconvincing debut." Hickins has been a speaker and panelist at the MIT Sloan CIO Symposium in 2013 and 2014.

== Bibliography ==
- The Actual Adventures of Michael Missing (1991) ISBN 0-394-58741-3
- Blomqvist (1996) ISBN 0-595-40128-7
- Lion Heartbreak (1998)
- The Silk Factory. Finding Threads of My Family's True Holocaust Story (June 2023)
