= Amy Guth =

American novelist

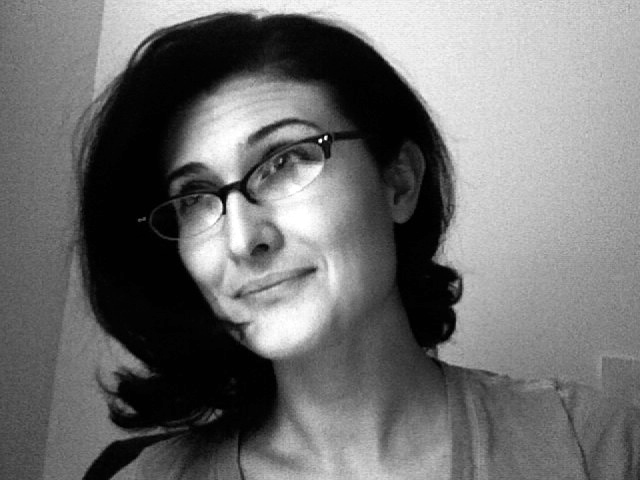
- Born: Asheville, North Carolina, U.S.
- Known for: Radio host Journalist; Business
- Website: www.amyguth.com

Amy Guth is an American radio host, writer and author, and publisher of Chicago Tribune daily publication, RedEye.

She was a reporter and digital editor for the Chicago Tribune's books section until February 2011, when the news organization named her as social media editor. In August 2013, Tribune Company tapped her to lead RedEye/Metromix Chicago. She is host of a Tribune Company's AM news-talk station, WGN weekend talk show, "RedEye Remix", after previous stints co-hosting "WGN Weekends with Alex and Amy" and "ChicagoNow Radio."

In 2013, Guth was named “Chicago’s Funniest Media Personality,” winning the contest hosted by the Laugh Factory Chicago.

Guth is author of the 2006 novel Three Fallen Women.

Guth was involved in the debut season of Chicago Live!, interviewing guests for the live stage production and radio broadcast including Scott Turow.

In 2014, media critic Robert Feder named her among the top ten most powerful women in Chicago media.
