= William Tester =

American novelist

- Born: April 26, 1960 (age 66); Charleston, South Carolina, U.S.
- Education: Columbia University (BA); Syracuse University (MFA)
- Occupations: Writer, arborist
- Writing career
- Genres: novel, short stories, memoir, poetry

William Tester (born April 26, 1960) is an American short story writer and novelist. He was raised on a cattle ranch in Florida and is a graduate of Columbia University (B.A., 1984) and Syracuse University (M.F.A., 1995). He published the novel Darling in 1991 (ISBN 0-394-56872-9) and the story collection Head (ISBN 1-889330-48-5) in 2000. He is the recipient of a National Endowment for the Arts Fellowship and The Mary McCarthy Prize. His short fiction and memoir excerpts have appeared in Esquire, Bomb, Nerve, TriQuarterly, The Quarterly, The North American Review, Witness and other literary journals. He taught writing at Columbia University, the State University of New York and Virginia Commonwealth University. He married artist and architectural designer Josefa Mulaire in May 1992.
