= Jennifer Allen =

American author and commentator

Jennifer Allen (born 1961) is an American author and commentator. She has worked for the NFL Network and as an on-air reporter. She is the daughter of football coach George Allen and sister of politician George Allen and football executive Bruce Allen.

== Childhood ==
Allen grew up the only daughter and youngest child of professional football coach George Allen. She has three brothers. George Allen is a former United States Senator and Governor of Virginia. Bruce was the president and general manager of the Washington Redskins and previously the general manager of the Tampa Bay Buccaneers. Greg is a clinical psychologist.

Allen's mother came from French Tunisia and was of a Sephardic Jewish background, which became an issue in her brother's 2006 senatorial re-election campaign in Virginia.

== Books ==
Allen is the author of three books, a collection of short stories, Better Get Your Angel On and a memoir, Fifth Quarter: The Scrimmage of a Football Coach's Daughter, describing her childhood as a coach's daughter and relationship that her family had with the members of the Los Angeles Rams and the Washington Redskins that her father coached; as well as the author of Hōkūle'a, Mālama Honua, A Voyage of Hope, a chronicle of the worldwide voyage of a Hawaiian sailing vessel, Hōkūleʻa, which is navigated without modern instruments.

Mālama Honua was published by Patagonia, Inc. in 2017. Mālama Honua, which means in "to care for the Earth", Hawaiian, documented the stories of original peoples and environmentalists in countries and island states around the globe. In 2018, the book won the Independent Book Publishers Association Category: Nature and the Environment, Gold Award for non-fiction environmental writing. It also earned Independent Book Publishers Association Silver Award for Coffee Table Book and the Foreword Indies Book Award in the category of Ecology and the Environment.

Pat Conroy called Fifth Quarter "the best book about football I've ever read—and Jennifer Allen never played a down in her life." In The Washington Post, Jonathan Yardley reviewed the book, noting that in writing about her father, she "illuminates his innermost soul and gives us not just a football coach but a human being.”

The memoir contains claims that George held her by her feet over Niagara Falls, struck her boyfriend in the head with a pool cue, threw his brother Bruce through a glass sliding door, tackled his brother Gregory, breaking his collarbone, and dragged Jennifer upstairs by her hair. In the book, she wrote, "George hoped someday to become a dentist...George said he saw dentistry as a perfect profession—getting paid to make people suffer."

In May 2006, Allen qualified some of the claims made in the book. With regard to the pool cue incident, she claimed it was a joke and that "Allen was simply testing her boyfriend's reflexes." With regard to the dentist quote, Allen claims that the book was a "novelization of the past" and written from the perspective of a young girl "surrounded by older brothers and a larger-than-life father." She claims to have a great relationship with her brother and noted that George walked her down the aisle at her wedding.

== Career ==
From 2004 to 2010, Allen contributed to the NFL Network as on-air reporter, focusing on the personal lives of coaches and families in the National Football League (NFL). In January 2006, she discussed how the firing of a head coach affects the coach's family, basing her commentary on her own experiences when her father was fired.

Since 1996, she has also periodically narrated and reported for NFL Films, including the 2012 "Fearsome Foursome" episode of A Football Life. Allen has contributed articles to The New York Times Magazine, George, Play, Rolling Stone, The New York Times, and The New Republic.

Her journalism has also been anthologized. "Dinner, New Year's Eve, 1968," appeared in Football, Great Writing About the National Sport. "Boys! Give Me Boys!" appeared in Because I Said So: 33 Mothers Write About Children, Sex, Men, Aging, Faith, Race, and Themselves, edited by Camille Peri and Kate Moses and published by HarperCollins in 2005. "Euro Disney: A Postcard" was published in Paris In Mind: Stories, Essays, and Reflections on the City of Paris, edited by Jennifer Lee and published by Vintage Books in 2003.

A graduate of New York University (NYU), Allen has taught fiction and non-fiction writing at NYU, Connecticut College, Bennington College, and the University of California, San Diego.
