= Noy Holland =

American writer (born 1960)

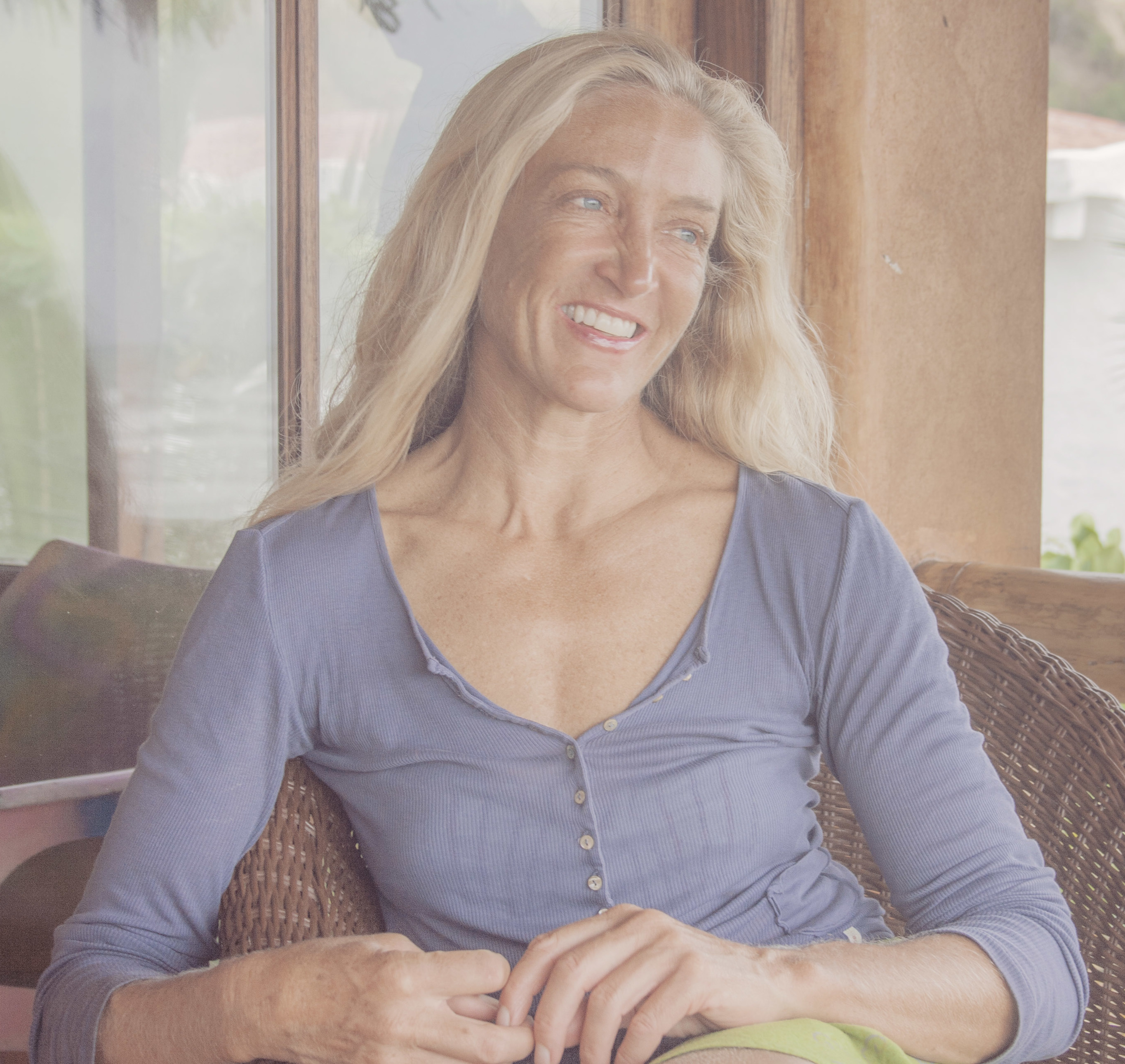
- Noy Holland, 2014
- Born: December 3, 1960 (age 65)
- Occupation: Writer
- Spouse: Sam Michel

Noy Holland (born December 3, 1960) is an American writer.

== Biography ==
Holland received her Masters in Fine Arts from the University of Florida in 1994.

Holland is a Professor in the MFA Program for Poets & Writers at the University of Massachusetts Amherst. She has also taught at Phillips Academy and the University of Florida. She directs the Writers in the Schools Project in Amherst, Massachusetts.

She received a fellowship from the National Endowment for the Arts in 2003. She has also received fellowships from the University of Florida, the Bread Loaf Writers' Conference, and the Massachusetts Cultural Council.

Her writing has appeared in The American Voice, Ploughshares, Story Quarterly, Glimmer Train, The Quarterly, Conjunctions, Black Warrior Review, Open City, Noon, and other publications.

Holland's most recent book is I Was Trying to Describe What It Feels Like: New and Selected Stories, published in January 2017 by Counterpoint. She is also the author of Bird (Counterpoint), The Spectacle of the Body (Knopf), What Begins with Bird (Fiction Collective Two), and Swim for the Little One First (Fiction Collective Two).

Her husband is the writer Sam Michel.

== Bibliography ==
=== Short story collections ===
- The Spectacle of the Body (Knopf, 1994). Nine stories.
- What Begins with Bird (Fiction Collective Two, 2005). Six stories.
- Swim for the Little One First (Fiction Collective Two, 2012). 12 stories.
- I Was Trying to Describe What It Feels Like: New and Selected Stories (Counterpoint, 2017). Collection of 44 stories (14 from previous collections).

=== Novels ===
- Bird (Counterpoint, 2015)
