= Four Walls Eight Windows =

Defunct American independent book publisher

- Status: Defunct (2004)
- Founded: 1987
- Founder: John G. H. Oakes and Daniel Simon
- Successor: Thunder's Mouth Press
- Country of origin: United States
- Headquarters location: New York City
- Publication types: Books

Four Walls Eight Windows was an American independent book publisher in New York City. Known as 4W8W or Four Walls, the company was notable for its dual commitment to progressive politics and adventurous, edgy literary fiction.

== History ==
Four Walls debuted in the fall of 1987, under the direction of two young editors, John G. H. Oakes and Daniel Simon. (Simon had previously had an imprint under the same name at Writers and Readers Publishing.)

In 1995, Oakes and Simon parted ways. Oakes remained as publisher and Simon went on to found Seven Stories Press.

In 2004, Four Walls Eight Windows was acquired by the Avalon Publishing Group. Its entire list was incorporated into the Thunder's Mouth Press imprint of Avalon, of which Oakes became publisher. Thunder's Mouth Press itself was acquired in 2007 by the Perseus Books Group. (Oakes then became executive editor at Atlas & Company under James Atlas; he is now publisher of The Evergreen Review.) Perseus stopped publishing books under the Thunder's Mouth imprint in May 2007.

== Authors ==
Among the more significant contemporary authors published by Four Walls were Steve Aylett, Ed Ayres, Michael Brodsky, Octavia Butler, Jerome Charyn, Andrei Codrescu, Richard Condon, Sue Coe, R. Crumb, Paul Di Filippo, Cory Doctorow, Andrea Dworkin, Brian Evenson, Annie Ernaux, Allen Ginsberg, Abbie Hoffman, Margo Howard-Howard, Kathe Koja, Gordon Lish, Gary Lutz, Jim Munroe, Harvey Pekar, Tito Perdue, Rudy Rucker, John Ralston Saul, Lucius Shepard, Sasha Sokolov and Edward D. Wood, Jr. It also had a line of "modern classics," which included authors such as Nelson Algren, Sherwood Anderson, George Plimpton and Sloan Wilson.
