= University of Massachusetts Amherst College of Humanities and Fine Arts =

College in the United States

College of Humanities & Fine Arts
- Public constituent college
- University of Massachusetts Amherst
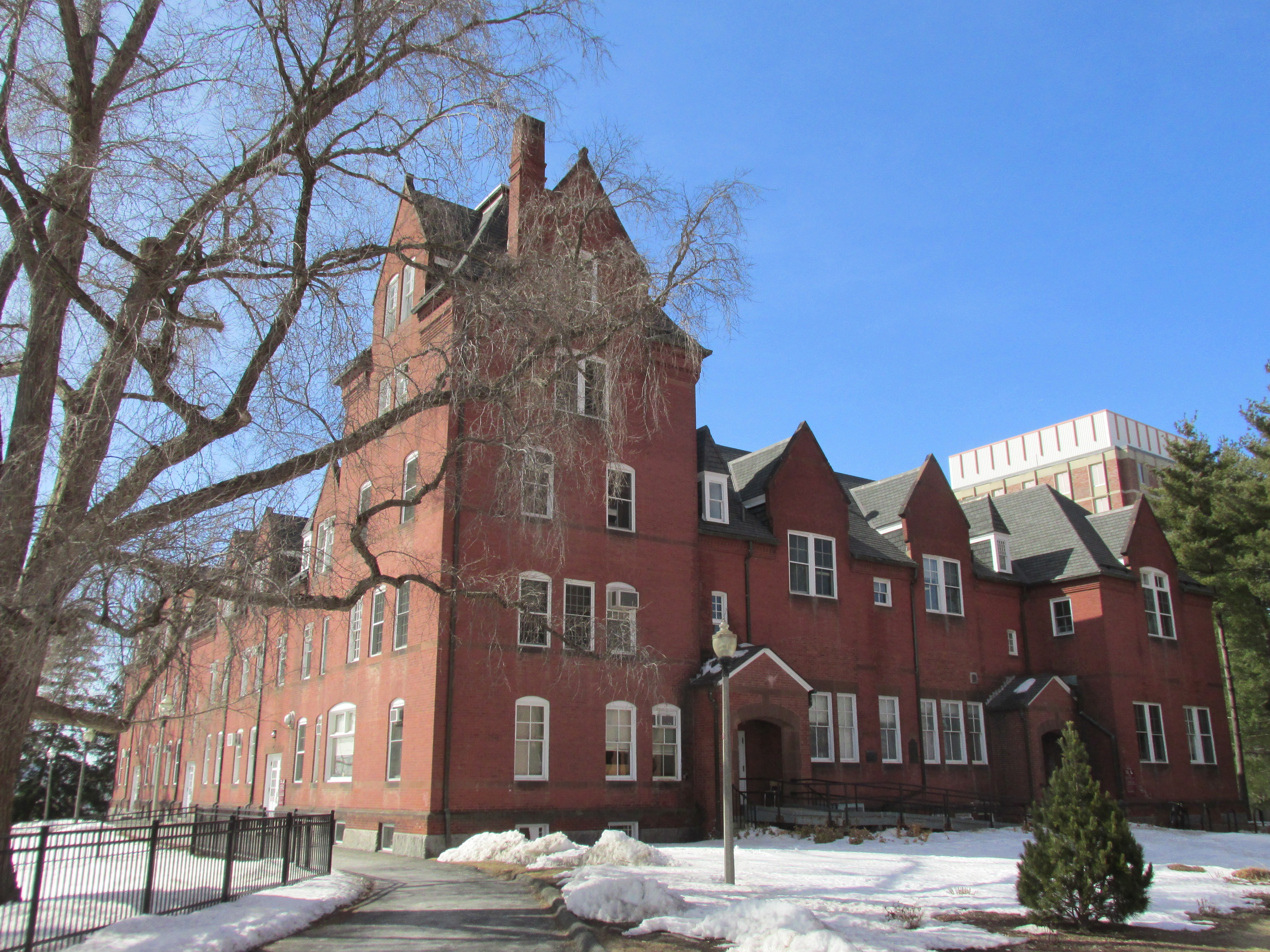
- South College in 2014

- Logo
- Location: Amherst, Massachusetts
- Coordinates: 42°23′22.3″N 72°31′44.0″W
- Full name: University of Massachusetts Amherst College of Humanities and Fine Arts
- Abbreviation: HFA
- Established: 1915; 111 years ago
- Colors
- Gender: Co-educational
- Dean: Maria del Guadalupe Davidson
- Membership: 3,083
- Undergraduates: 2,483
- Postgraduates: 600
- Newspaper: The Scribe (Literary Journal)
- Website: http://www.umass.edu/hfa/

The College of Humanities & Fine Arts (in full, University of Massachusetts Amherst College of Humanities and Fine Arts) is a college of the University of Massachusetts Amherst. The college was founded in 1915.

== Departments ==
- W.E.B. Du Bois Department of Afro-American Studies
- Department of Architecture
- Department of Art
- Department of Classics
- Department of English
- Department of History
- Department of History of Art and Architecture
- Department of Judaic and Near Eastern Studies
- Department of Languages, Literatures and Cultures
- Department of Linguistics
- Department of Music and Dance
- Department of Philosophy
- Department of Theater
- Department of Women, Gender, Sexuality Studies

== Programs ==
- Arthur F. Kinney Center for Interdisciplinary Renaissance Studies
- Arts Extension Service
- Center for the Study of African American Language
- Film Studies Program
- Institute for Holocaust, Genocide, and Memory Studies
- Interdisciplinary Studies Institute
- The Writing Program

== MFA Program for Poets & Writers ==
The MFA Program for Poets & Writers is a graduate creative writing program founded in 1963 and is part of the English Department at the College of Humanities and Fine Arts.

== Notable alumni ==
- Jim Waldo, Gordon McKay Professor of Computer Science at Harvard University
