= Gordon Burn Prize =

Annual literary award

The Gordon Burn Prize was launched in 2013 as a vehicle by which "to reward fiction or non-fiction written in the English language, which in the opinion of the judges most successfully represents the spirit and sensibility of [Gordon Burn]'s literary methods: novels which dare to enter history and interrogate the past ... literature which challenges perceived notions of genre and makes us think again about just what it is that we are reading."

The prize is jointly organised by the Gordon Burn Trust, New Writing North and Faber & Faber. The winner receives a prize sum (originally £5,000), and is offered the use of Burn's cottage in Berwickshire as a writers' retreat. Up until 2024, the prize ceremony was generally the first event of the Durham Book Festival. In 2024, the prize fund was doubled to £10,000 due to new sponsors and the award ceremony relocated to Newcastle upon Tyne.

== Winners and shortlists ==
Year	Author	Title	Publisher	Ref
2013	Ben Myers	Pig Iron	Bluemoose Books	
2013	Anthony Cartwright	How I Killed Margaret Thatcher	Tindal Street Press	
2013	Duncan Hamilton	The Footballer Who Could Fly	Century	
2013	Richard Lloyd Parry	People Who Eat Darkness	Jonathan Cape	
2013	Jean Rafferty	Myra, Beyond Saddleworth	Wild Wolf Publishing	
2014	Paul Kingsnorth	The Wake	Unbound	
2014	Richard Benson	The Valley	Bloomsbury	
2014	Richard House	The Kills	Picador	
2014	Olivia Laing	The Trip to Echo Spring	Canongate	
2014	Gruff Rhys	American Interior	Hamish Hamilton	
2014	Willy Vlautin	The Free	Faber and Faber	
2015	Dan Davies	In Plain Sight: The Life and Lies of Jimmy Savile	Quercus	
2015	Honor Gavin	Midland	Penned in the Margins	
2015	Romesh Gunesekera	Noon Tide Toll	Granta Books	
2015	Richard King	Original Rockers	Faber and Faber	
2015	Peter Pomerantsev	Nothing Is True and Everything Is Possible	PublicAffairs	
2016	David Szalay	All That Man Is	Jonathan Cape	
2016	Jeremy Gavron	A Woman on the Edge of Time: A Son's Search for his Mother	Scribe	
2016	Olivia Laing	The Lonely City: Adventures in the Art of Being Alone	Picador	
2016	Ottessa Moshfegh	Eileen	Penguin Press	
2016	Harry Parker	Anatomy of a Soldier	Faber and Faber	
2016	Adrian Tempany	And the Sun Shines Now	Faber and Faber	
2017	Denise Mina	The Long Drop	Harvill Secker	
2017	Kapka Kassabova	Border: A Journey to the Edge of Europe	Granta Books	
2017	David Keenan	This Is Memorial Device	Faber and Faber	
2017	Lara Pawson	This Is the Place to Be	CB Editions	
2017	Gwendoline Riley	First Love	Granta Books	
2017	Adelle Stripe	Black Teeth and a Brilliant Smile	Wrecking Ball Press	
2018	Jesse Ball	Census	Granta Books	
2018	Nicola Barker	H(a)ppy	William Heinemann	
2018	Guy Gunaratne	In Our Mad and Furious City	Tinder Press	
2018	Olivia Laing	Crudo	Picador	
2018	Deborah Levy	The Cost of Living	Hamish Hamilton	
2018	Michelle McNamara	I'll Be Gone in the Dark	Faber and Faber	
2019	David Keenan	For the Good Times	Faber and Faber	
2019	Pat Barker	The Silence of the Girls	Penguin	
2019	Bernardine Evaristo	Girl, Woman, Other	Hamish Hamilton	
2019	Niven Govinden	This Brutal House	Dialogue Books	
2019	Max Porter	Lanny	Faber and Faber	
2019	Nafissa Thompson-Spires	Heads of the Colored People	Chatto & Windus	
2020	Peter Pomerantsev	This Is Not Propaganda	Faber and Faber	
2020	Jenn Ashworth	Notes Made While Falling	Goldsmiths Press	
2020	Paul Mendez	Rainbow Milk	Dialogue Books	
2020	Deborah Orr	Motherwell: A Girlhood	Weidenfeld & Nicolson	
2020	Lemn Sissay	My Name Is Why	Canongate	
2020	Lisa Taddeo	Three Women	Bloomsbury	
2021	Hanif Abdurraqib	A Little Devil in America	Allen Lane	
2021	Sam Byers	Come Join Our Disease	Faber and Faber	
2021	Jenni Fagan	Luckenbooth	William Heinemann	
2021	Salena Godden	Mrs Death Misses Death	Canongate	
2021	Tabitha Lasley	Sea State	HarperCollins	
2021	Doireann Ní Ghríofa	A Ghost in the Throat	Tramp Press	
2022	Preti Taneja	Aftermath	And Other Stories	
2022	Graeme Macrae Burnet	Case Study	Saraband	
2022	Margo Jefferson	Constructing a Nervous System	Granta Books	
2022	David Whitehouse	About a Son	Phoenix Press	
2022	Lea Ypi	Free: Coming of Age at the End of History	Allen Lane	
2023 / 2024	Kathryn Scanlan	Kick the Latch	New Directions	
2023 / 2024	Rory Carroll	Killing Thatcher	Mudlark	
2023 / 2024	Jonathan Escoffery	If I Survive You	4th Estate	
2023 / 2024	Anna Funder	Wifedom: Mrs Orwell's Invisible Life	Viking Press	
2023 / 2024	John Niven	O Brother	Canongate	
2023 / 2024	Megan Nolan	Ordinary Human Failings	Jonathan Cape	
2023 / 2024	Tanya Tagaq	Split Tooth	And Other Stories	
2025	Jenni Fagan	Ootlin	Hutchinson Heinemann	
2025	Rita Bullwinkel	Headshot	Daunt Books	
2025	Emma Glass	Mrs Jekyll	Cheerio	
2025	Gabrielle de la Puente and Zarina Muhammad	Poor Artists	Particular Books	
2025	Tom Newlands	Only Here, Only Now	Phoenix	
