= Windham–Campbell Literature Prizes =

Literary award

The Donald Windham Sandy M. Campbell Literature Prizes
- Awarded for: to call attention to literary achievement and provide writers the opportunity to focus on their work independent of financial concerns
- Date: 2024
- Country: United States
- Presented by: Beinecke Rare Book & Manuscript Library
- Reward: 175,000 USD
- First award: 4 March 2013; 13 years ago
- Website: windhamcampbell.org

The Donald Windham Sandy M. Campbell Literature Prizes are an American literary award offering unrestricted grants in four categories, namely fiction, nonfiction, poetry and drama. Established at Yale University in 2011, the first prizes were presented in 2013. Administered by the Beinecke Rare Book & Manuscript Library, the award recognizes English-language writers from across the world. The mission of the award is to call attention to literary achievement and provide writers the opportunity to focus on their work independent of financial concerns. In 2017, the category of poetry was added and eight prizes have been awarded annually since then.

Since 2023, winners receive a citation, award and an unrestricted grant of $175,000. The individual prizes are among the richest literary prize amounts in the world, if not the richest in certain categories. The award is endowed from the combined estates of writer Donald Windham and actor Sandy Campbell. Campbell was Windham's companion of 45 years, and when Campbell died in 1988 he left his estate to Windham, with the understanding that a literary award would be created from the combined estate after Windham's death. Windham died in 2010, and in 2011 Yale announced that they would become administrators of the new award.

The inaugural winners were announced on March 4, 2013, and a ceremony conferring the awards took place at Yale on September 10, 2013, with the nine recipients receiving a citation, award and an unrestricted grant of $150,000 each.

== Recipients ==
Windham–Campbell Literature Prize winners
Year	Category	Recipient	Country	Ref.
2013 (Note: The prizewinners with the following citations were announced by Yale president-elect Peter Salovey on March 4, 2013. Each winner received $150,000.)	Drama	Stephen Adly Guirgis: "Stephen Adly Guirgis writes dramatic dialogue with passion and humor, creating characters who live on the edge, and whose linguistic bravado reinvigorates the American vernacular."	United States	
2013	Drama	Tarell Alvin McCraney: "Tarell Alvin McCraney's working class characters inhabit an extraordinary mythic universe, speaking a poetic language through which we grasp the spiritual stature of embattled people."	United States	
2013	Drama	Naomi Wallace: "Naomi Wallace mines historical situations in plays that are muscular, devastating, and unwavering."	United States	
2013	Fiction	Tom McCarthy: "Tom McCarthy constructs strange worlds where we find reflective echoes of our own and meditations on the meaning and making of art."	United Kingdom	
2013	Fiction	James Salter: "Sentence by sentence, James Salter's elegantly natural prose has a precision and clarity which make ordinary words swing wide open."	United States	
2013	Fiction	Zoë Wicomb: "Zoë Wicomb's subtle, lively language and beautifully crafted narratives explore the complex entanglements of home, and the continuing challenges of being in the world."	South Africa	
2013	Non-Fiction	Adina Hoffman: "In a land where even the most cautious nonfiction can draw howls of protest, Adina Hoffman combines fastidious listening, even-handed research, and prose so engaged that it makes the long-vanished visible again."	United States	
2013	Non-Fiction	Jeremy Scahill: "Jeremy Scahill's investigative reporting is in the best tradition of speaking truth to power, waging a political campaign by journalistic means, indefatigable in its detail and international in outlook."	United States	
2013	Non-Fiction	Jonny Steinberg: "Using a novelistic style that gives everyday people heroic complexity and scale, Jonny Steinberg allows us to encounter lives that enlarge our empathy and sharpen our understanding of the human condition."	South Africa	
2014 (Note: The prizewinners with the following citations were announced by Yale president Peter Salovey on March 7, 2014.)	Drama	Kia Corthron: "Through her command of dramatic spectacle, Kia Corthron places often unheard and marginalized characters within a historical and political context that gives their lives an urgent and poetic resonance."	United States	
2014	Drama	Sam Holcroft: "Sam Holcroft's plays explore the routinized and expressive registers of language, gesture, and role-playing, walking the uncomfortably thin line between spectatorship and complicity."	United Kingdom	
2014	Drama	Noëlle Janaczewska: "Noëlle Janaczewska brings innovative stagecraft and a questioning voice to plays that translate cultural and political tensions into drama as complex as it is illuminating."	Australia	
2014	Fiction	Nadeem Aslam: "Nadeem Aslam's deftly crafted novels explore historical and political trauma with lyricism and profound compassion."	Pakistan / United Kingdom	
2014	Fiction	Jim Crace: "Jim Crace's ever-varied novels return us to the body, to ceremony and to community in a disenchanted world, transforming the indifferent and the repugnant alike into things of beauty."	United Kingdom	
2014	Fiction	Aminatta Forna: "Aminatta Forna writes through and beyond personal experience to speak to the wider world in subtly constructed narratives that reveal the ongoing aftershocks of living through violence and war."	Sierra Leone / United Kingdom	
2014	Non-Fiction	Pankaj Mishra: "Pursuing high standards of literary style, Pankaj Mishra gives us new narratives about the evolution of modern Asia. He charts the journey from the Indian small town to the metropolis and rebuffs imperialist clichés with equal verve."	India	
2014	Non-Fiction	John Vaillant: "John Vaillant writes gripping narratives that combine science, geography, history and anthropology to convey his passionate commitment to preserving natural resources in an environmentally threatened world."	United States / Canada	
2015 (Note: The prizewinners with the following citations were announced by Yale president Peter Salovey on February 24, 2015.)	Drama	Jackie Sibblies Drury: "Jackie Sibblies Drury deftly blends historical inquiry and meta-theatrical experiment to challenge assumptions about race, performance, and individual responsibility."	United States	
2015	Drama	Helen Edmundson: "Helen Edmundson's ambitious plays distill historical complexities through characters whose passions and ethical dilemmas mirror and illuminate a larger political landscape."	United Kingdom	
2015	Drama	Debbie Tucker Green: "Pushing speech and silence to the limit, Debbie Tucker Green's plays expose the brutal choices of individuals bound by the imperatives of family, society, and love."	United Kingdom	
2015	Fiction	Teju Cole: "Teju Cole's peripatetic narrators, like his prose, revel in the possibilities and limitations of global urbanity, navigating the fine line between choice and circumstance, perception and memory."	United States / Nigeria	
2015	Fiction	Helon Habila: "Helon Habila is that rare combination of storyteller and stylist who challenges expectations while deepening our empathy for ordinary people confronting extraordinary times."	Nigeria	
2015	Fiction	Ivan Vladislavic: "Ivan Vladislavić's fiction explores the uncomfortable aftermath of apartheid through inventive meditations on the complex intersection of history, politics, and art."	South Africa	
2015	Non-Fiction	Edmund de Waal: "Edmund de Waal's sure narrative instinct and lyrical imagination inform a deeply felt examination of the hold that objects have on our personal and collective memory."	United Kingdom	
2015	Non-Fiction	Geoff Dyer: "Omnivorously curious and psychologically probing, Geoff Dyer's writings reinvent again and again the possibilities of nonfiction, discovering as many new subjects as he does ways of writing about them."	United Kingdom	
2015	Non-Fiction	John Jeremiah Sullivan: "John Jeremiah Sullivan's wide-ranging, exuberant essays engage the full spectrum of American life with passion, precision, and wit."	United States	
2016 (Note: The prizewinners were announced on February 29, 2016. The prize highlighted some works by each author.)	Drama	Branden Jacobs-Jenkins: "In his audacious and disarming plays, Branden Jacobs-Jenkins dismantles received ideas of race, history, and American culture."	United States	
2016	Drama	Hannah Moscovitch: "Hannah Moscovitch fuses the intimate and the epic in fiercely intelligent plays about violence, responsibility, and redemption."	Canada	
2016	Drama	Abbie Spallen: "Abbie Spallen's plays confront audiences with all the awkward questions, reminding us with thrilling proof that theater can still be urgently necessary."	Ireland	
2016	Fiction	Tessa Hadley: "Tessa Hadley brilliantly illuminates ordinary lives with extraordinary prose that is superbly controlled, psychologically acute, and subtly powerful."	United Kingdom	
2016	Fiction	C. E. Morgan: "In language that is lush and bold C. E. Morgan's ambitious fiction explores poverty, wealth, faith, eros, and the inextricable complications of race in America."	United States	
2016	Fiction	Jerry Pinto: "Jerry Pinto's writing is deeply empathetic, humorous, and humane, drawing on personal experience to tell stories much larger than the lives they contain."	India	
2016	Non-Fiction	Hilton Als: "In brilliant, fearless essays that blend memoir, biography, and cultural criticism, Hilton Als explores and explodes our ideas of sexual and racial identity."	United States	
2016	Non-Fiction	Stanley Crouch: "Stanley Crouch's lyrical, sharp, and deeply American writing shines a bright light on the unexpected corners of our music, literature, culture, and history."	United States	
2016	Non-Fiction	Helen Garner: "Helen Garner brings acute observations and narrative skill to bear on the conflicts and tragedies of contemporary Australian life."	Australia	
2017 (Note: The prizewinners were announced March 1, 2017. The authors were chosen for their "literary achievement or promise" and the reward money of $165,000 each would support their continued writing.)	Drama	Marina Carr: "Marina Carr draws on the essential elements of Greek tragedy to create stories for modern heroines who must make the starkest dramatic choices."	Ireland	
2017	Drama	Ike Holter: "Ike Holter writes explosive plays that are visceral, ambitious, and populated with diverse characters for whom the personal is inseparable from the political."	United States	
2017	Fiction	André Alexis: "André Alexis's work displays a mastery of literature's history and a startling power of invention, balancing intellectual sophistication with a sense of humor, pathos, and beauty."	Canada / Trinidad and Tobago	
2017	Fiction	Erna Brodber: "Erna Brodber's uncompromising fiction weaves strands of diasporic history, memory, and identity into illuminating new forms that respond to the need to act as well as the need to know."	Jamaica	
2017	Non-Fiction	Maya Jasanoff: "Maya Jasanoff's brilliant historical writing brings to life forgotten worlds and characters in richly textured narratives."	United States	
2017	Non-Fiction	Ashleigh Young: "With honest, insightful prose, Ashleigh Young offers intimate and playful glimpses of coming of age in small-town New Zealand."	New Zealand	
2017	Poetry	Ali Cobby Eckermann: "Through song and story, Ali Cobby Eckermann confronts the violent history of Australia's Stolen Generations and gives language to unspoken lineages of trauma and loss."	Australia	
2017	Poetry	Carolyn Forché: "Carolyn Forché's politically engaged work redefines lyric poetry through its attention to history and care for the world."	United States	
2018 (Note: The prizewinners were announced on March 7, 2018. The recipients of the $165,000 prize to support their work and give them freedom to write.)	Drama	Lucas Hnath for "agile writing which ranges across genres and subjects with voracious curiosity; his wit, formal daring and poetic precision crystallize dramas that are socially incisive and indelible." Works include The Christians (2014) and A Doll's House, Part 2 (2017).	United States	
2018	Drama	Suzan-Lori Parks: for being "an artist whose ethical imagination confronts rather than consoles; she acknowledges in the fissures of language and human relations the complexities of a fraught world." Works include The Death of Last Black Man in the Whole Entire World (1992), Venus (1996), Topdog/Underdog (2001), and Father Comes Home from the Wars (Parts 1, 2 & 3) (2014).	United States	
2018	Fiction	John Keene: for writing that "[w]ith coruscating imagination, language and thought, …experiments with concealed scenes from history and literature, stepping outside the confines of conventional narrative." Works include Annotations (1995) and Counternarratives (2015).	United States	
2018	Fiction	Jennifer Nansubuga Makumbi: for work that "opens up a bold and innovatory vista in African letters, encompassing ancient wounds that disquiet the present, and offering the restitution to be found in memory and ritual." She is the author of the novel Kintu (2014).	Uganda / United Kingdom	
2018	Non-Fiction	Sarah Bakewell for work that "unknots complex philosophical thought with verve and wit; her eye for detail and her animated conversation bring readers to inhabit the lives of great philosophers." Works include How to Live: A Life of Montaigne (2010) and At the Existentialist Café (2016).	United Kingdom	
2018	Non-Fiction	Olivia Laing for being "a cartographer of human emotion, mixing memoir, biography and critical engagement with an acute sense of place; through the arts, she searches the depths of the self." Works include To the River (2011), The Trip to Echo Spring (2013), and The Lonely City (2016).	United Kingdom	
2018	Poetry	Lorna Goodison for poetry that "draws us into a panoramic history of a woman's life, bearing witness to female embodiment, the colonial legacy, mortality, and the sacred." She is the author of 13 collections of poetry including I Am Becoming My Mother (1986) and Oracabessa (2013).	Canada / Jamaica	
2018	Poetry	Cathy Park Hong for poetry with "exhilarating and surprising language that connects us to unheard migrant voices, and her searching look at dystopic states which gives her poetry urgent power." Works include Dance Dance Revolution (2007) and Engine Empire (2012).	United States	
2019 (Note: The prizewinners were announced March 12, 2019. The authors were chosen for their "literary achievement or promise" and the reward money of $165,000 each would support their continued writing.)	Drama	Patricia Cornelius: "Patricia Cornelius channels the power of resisting received literary tradition in order to open up a space where the lives of characters on the margins can become vessels of universal truths."	Australia	
2019	Drama	Young Jean Lee: "Young Jean Lee is a genuinely original playwright and theater-maker who explores diverse theatrical styles, forms, and subjects with a dramaturgy that constantly takes risks and pushes the boundaries of what is possible."	United States	
2019	Fiction	David Chariandy: "Offering a vision at once entirely humane and immensely tender, David Chariandy lays bare the ways that gestures and details articulate the revelations of grief as well as the intimacies found within fraught and fraying social spaces."	Canada	
2019	Fiction	Danielle McLaughlin: "Danielle McLaughlin's short stories capture the beauty and brutality of human relationships, imbuing them with near-magical qualities rooted in the details of everyday life in a manner both wry and resonant."	Ireland	
2019	Non-Fiction	Raghu Karnad: "Combining forensic archival research with imaginative fire and unsettling national and colonial histories, Raghu Karnad creates an epic of un-forgetting that brings the experience of Indian soldiers of the Second World War into our common compass."	India	
2019	Non-Fiction	Rebecca Solnit: "With fearless brilliance, Rebecca Solnit's essays range through subject matters that include politics, history, literature, art, and feminism in a manner at once provocative, erudite, and intensely engaging."	United States	
2019	Poetry	Kwame Dawes: "Kwame Dawes's visceral, memorable, and urgent lyricism results in a poetry of compassion, moral seriousness, and depth that resonates across continents."	Ghana / Jamaica / United States	
2019	Poetry	Ishion Hutchinson: "Conjuring Jamaica and the world within, Ishion Hutchinson's poetry surprises and stuns with formal innovation, musical clarity, and historical depth, illuminating life 'after hurricanes' and 'after Pompeii.'"	Jamaica	
2020 (Note: The prize winners were announced March 19, 2020. Each winner received $165,000.)	Drama	Julia Cho: "In stagecraft intimate with cadences of the spoken and unspoken, Julia Cho enlivens human connection in the languages of home and estrangement."	United States	
2020	Drama	Aleshea Harris: "Aleshea Harris's meticulous pageantries of brutal injustice vibrate with rage, grief, hope, and truth, breathing life into ancient forms and indelibly making seen those who were unseen."	United States	
2020	Fiction	Yiyun Li: "Yiyun Li masterfully explores the landscape of loss with delicacy and precision, restoring the fractured lives of ordinary people on the margins, endowing them with agency and power."	United States	
2020	Fiction	Namwali Serpell: "Namwali Serpell reimagines the transmission of modern history through the commingled lives of her Zambian characters, writing unerringly sure prose and re-enchanting the contemporary novel in the process."	United States / Zambia	
2020	Non-Fiction	Anne Boyer: "With unflinching self-scrutiny, Anne Boyer exposes uncomfortable truths about our culture's mistreatment of the individual in duress and the ways in which we are complicit in that neglect."	United States	
2020	Non-Fiction	Maria Tumarkin: "Maria Tumarkin's inventive writing on our current historical moment shows a relentless empathy and curiosity about the complexities of our world and its uncertainties."	Australia	
2020	Poetry	Bhanu Kapil: "Through transgressive, lyrical language Bhanu Kapil undoes multiple genres to excavate crucial questions of trauma, healing, immigration, and embodiment at the outskirts of performance and process."	United States / United Kingdom	
2020	Poetry	Jonah Mixon-Webster: "With tenderness and ferocity, Jonah Mixon-Webster invents dynamic multi-modal forms to indict structural racism, and to connect the personal to the violence and beauty of history."	United States	
2021	Drama	Nathan Alan Davis: "Nathan Alan Davis is an artist whose work fuses depth of feeling and love of language, balancing the profound, the prosaic, and an overwhelming desire to reach through the fourth wall and pull his audiences towards him."	United States	
2021	Drama	Michael R. Jackson: "By clothing bracing and irreverent truths in song and wit, Michael R. Jackson lifts us into worlds more vibrant and malleable than any we inhabit from day to day, infusing musical theater's capacity to liberate with a fierce, joyful transgression."	United States	
2021	Fiction	Dionne Brand: "With genre-bending explorations of narrative form, Dionne Brand honors the complexities of diasporic experience, gracefully bringing to life the fundamental relationship between politics, aesthetics, and love."	Canada / Trinidad and Tobago	
2021	Fiction	Renee Gladman: "Aesthetically precise and formally daring, Renee Gladman sets us adrift in the country of her imagination, challenging us to puzzle out fluency, space, and meaning along the way."	United States	
2021	Non-fiction	Kate Briggs: "Pushing at the formal boundaries of the literary essay in witty, speculative prose, Kate Briggs explores the intricacies of translation and narrative structure in revelatory, provocative ways."	United Kingdom / The Netherlands	
2021	Non-fiction	Vivian Gornick: "In her landmark criticism and frank, elegiac, often ruefully funny memoirs, Vivian Gornick asks us to connect the ways in which we think, write, and love, drawing from her feminism, intellectual clarity, and radical awareness of a personal story's capacity to enlarge us all."	United States	
2021	Poetry	Canisia Lubrin: "Bursting beyond the confines of legibility and the individual, Canisia Lubrin summons up oceans, languages, and the self, the other, and the first-person plural, into a generous baroque project of anti-colonial plenitude."	Canada / Saint Lucia	
2021	Poetry	Natalie Scenters-Zapico: "Drawing inspiration from the border towns of El Paso and Ciudad Juárez, Natalie Scenters-Zapico's poems transform the violence of gender and cultural stereotypes into songs of resistance, resilience, and lyrical grace."	United States	
2022 (Note: The prize winners were announced March 29, 2022. The writers were honored for their literary achievement or promise. Each will receive $165,000 to support their work.)	Drama	Sharon Bridgforth: "Sharon Bridgforth's powerful poetics expand our notions of form by asserting a mix of spiritual and physical intelligence and ecstatic improvisation in her evocative style of jazz theater."	United States	
2022	Drama	Winsome Pinnock: "The force of Winsome Pinnock's epic and spacious dialogue deftly opens the ear and widens the heart; it gracefully compels the spirit to reckon with the necessity for absolute freedom."	United Kingdom	
2022	Fiction	Tsitsi Dangarembga: "Tsitsi Dangarembga's groundbreaking fiction, first appearing more than thirty years ago, brings to stunning life the ongoing struggles of African women striving for agency in the face of colonial, racist, and patriarchal forces."	Zimbabwe	
2022	Fiction	Siphiwe Gloria Ndlovu: "Siphiwe Gloria Ndlovu is both a chronicler and a conjurer whose soaring imagination creates a Zimbabwean past made of anguish and hope, of glory and despair: the story of the generations born at the crossroads of a country's history."	Zimbabwe	
2022	Non-fiction	Emmanuel Iduma: "In elegant, meditative vignettes that integrate art criticism, canny observation, and lyrical dispatches, Emmanuel Iduma invites readers to physically and spiritually observe the expansiveness of the world and its people."	Nigeria	
2022	Non-fiction	Margo Jefferson: "Margo Jefferson's incisive commentary on American life opens up counterintuitive dimensions, and invites us to rethink our assumptions, unknotting complex ethical subjects."	United States	
2022	Poetry	Zaffar Kunial: "With formally inventive poems drawing on multiple languages and literary traditions, Zaffar Kunial explores the complexities of hybrid cultural identities in an intimate and resonant lyric voice."	United Kingdom	
2022	Poetry	Wong May: "Spanning five decades, Wong May's startlingly original poetry gleams with wit; her delicate but acute irony balances its lucid seriousness with a fizzing verbal lightness."	Ireland / Singapore / China	
2023	Drama	Jasmine Lee-Jones: "Fierce, fresh, and funny, Jasmine Lee-Jones's iconoclastic plays reinvigorate the vernacular of contemporary theater for a new generation."	United Kingdom	
2023	Drama	Dominique Morisseau: "The nuanced characters and trenchant stories in Dominique Morisseau's plays strike at the heart of the most pressing conversations facing African Americans today, embodying a steadfast belief in the transformative power of love and art."	United States	
2023	Fiction	Percival Everett: "In its mordant humor and philosophical skepticism, Percival Everett's virtuosic body of work exemplifies fiction's capacity for play, vigilance, and compassion for life's precarity in an uncertain world."	United States	
2023	Fiction	Ling Ma: "Ling Ma meditates on urban anomie with wry humor and subversive imagination, brilliantly bending and blending genre to plumb the depths of her characters' origins, displacement, and alienation."	United States	
2023	Non-fiction	Darran Anderson: "With divinatory attention, Darran Anderson gives voice to the testimony of objects and geographies, chronicling the passage of individual memory as it turns into a community's archive and sustaining myth."	Ireland / United Kingdom	
2023	Non-fiction	Susan Williams: "Susan Williams chronicles imperial legacies with a forensic eye, a historical mind, and a decolonial sensibility for African agency; her findings are as stunning as they are transformative."	United Kingdom	
2023	Poetry	Alexis Pauline Gumbs: "The luminous, visionary poetry of Alexis Pauline Gumbs emerges from urgent realities of the present and haunting voices of the past to imagine alternative worlds shaped by radical listening, compassion, and love."	United States	
2023	Poetry	dg nanouk okpik: "dg nanouk okpik's lapidary poems sound the depths of language and landscape, shuttling between the ancient past and imperiled present of Inuit Alaska in a searching meditation on ecology and time."	United States	
2024	Drama	Christopher Chen: "Christopher Chen challenges our relationship to truth and accuracy, spectatorship and performance, repeatedly disrupting our expectations of drama and form."	United States	
2024	Drama	Sonya Kelly: "Sonya Kelly's plays sparkle with the quirkiness of the everyday, exploding fleeting moments into lyrical revelations, as she grapples with human fragility and pathos."	Ireland	
2024	Fiction	Deirdre Madden: "Deirdre Madden's novels bring to life the smallest movements of characters' impulses and thoughts, portraying the intricacies of human lives with compassion and effortless depth."	Ireland	
2024	Fiction	Kathryn Scanlan: "Blending documentary and fiction, Kathryn Scanlan fuses mundane experiences with the density of a redemptive vision, capturing the harrowing events of ordinary lives in raw, hard-hitting prose."	United States	
2024	Non-fiction	Hanif Abdurraqib: "Hanif Abdurraqib turns a poet's gaze toward cultural archives, finds grace in the kinetic energy of performing bodies, and shows us how to find joy and generosity in unlikely places."	United States	
2024	Non-fiction	Christina Sharpe: "Recalibrating images of black existence, Christina Sharpe's incisive, multi-layered work demands that we wrestle with brutality as we create meaning through language and art."	Canada / United States	
2024	Poetry	Jen Hadfield: "Jen Hadfield's intricate poems slow down time, reveal overlooked details of the natural world, and forge complex relationships between language, history, and place."	Canada / United Kingdom	
2024	Poetry	m. nourbeSe philip: "Inventing derelict tongues of refusal, m. nourbeSe philip breaks open and reimagines the horror of official speech and how it acts, creating a genre-obliterating poetry."	Canada / Trinidad and Tobago	
2025	Drama	Roy Williams: "Roy Williams's nuanced, multivocal portrayals of race and class lay bare uncomfortable truths about British identity, creating an essential and complex theater of contemporary life."	United Kingdom	
2025	Drama	Matilda Feyiṣayọ Ibini: "Matilda Feyiṣayọ Ibini's exuberant plays barrel onto the stage with joyful abandon, loosening the knots in the fabric of our socio-political lives with forensic attention to reveal new, hopeful ways of remaking our world."	United Kingdom	
2025	Fiction	Sigrid Nunez: "With each careful, concise novel, Sigrid Nunez scrupulously dissects the ethical complications of authorship, while still enacting—soulfully, quietly, paradoxically—the visceral and emotional force of character and story."	United States	
2025	Fiction	Anne Enright: "In her wide-ranging and wryly unsentimental fiction, Anne Enright explores the limitations and joys of our human need for belonging."	Ireland	
2025	Non-fiction	Patricia J. Williams: "In incisive works of moral philosophy and cultural critique, Patricia J. Williams draws together history, memoir, and legal scholarship to reckon with urgent issues of our time."	United States	
2025	Non-fiction	Rana Dasgupta: "Rana Dasgupta captures contemporary capitalism's visions and challenges with unflinching candor, and through delicately layered perspectives, allows his subjects to reveal themselves in a world of dissonances."	United Kingdom	
2025	Poetry	Tongo Eisen-Martin: "With unambiguous purpose and a distinctive voice, Tongo Eisen-Martin puts injustice, love, and intergenerational memory to work in verse that is both surreal and revolutionary."	United States	
2025	Poetry	Anthony V. Capildeo: "Anthony V. Capildeo's poems are immersed equally in narrative and lyric, querying forms with an insistent playfulness and a radical political consciousness."	Trinidad and Tobago / Scotland	
2026 (Note: American novelist Helen DeWitt declined the 2026 award as she felt unable to honour the associated promotional commitments.)	Drama	Christina Anderson: "In her deeply moving and beautifully layered plays, Christina Anderson mines intersections of intimate and political histories to breathe new life into the social drama as a form of ethical and metaphysical inquiry."	United States	
2026	Drama	S. Shakthidharan: "S. Shakthidharan draws from Tamil-Sri Lankan, South Asian, and Australian pasts to forge new meanings and connections among sprawling and complex histories."	Australia / Sri Lanka	
2026	Fiction	Gwendoline Riley: "Gwendoline Riley's incisive novels lay bare the cruelties and complicities of intimacy in prose that is at once meticulous and ruthless."	United Kingdom	
2026	Fiction	Adam Ehrlich Sachs: "Adam Ehrlich Sachs's philosophical fiction is a bravura exploration of the history of knowledge in all of its absurdity, strangeness, and difficult beauty."	United States	
2026	Non-fiction	Kei Miller: "Kei Miller's lyrical and trenchant essays hold a range of writerly selves and reveal deep and unsettling truths about the limits of language and the raced and gendered body moving through the world."	Jamaica	
2026	Non-fiction	Lucy Sante: "Legendary cultural critic, urban historian, and literary reporter, Lucy Sante focuses keen attention on overlooked facets of human experience and expands possibilities for nonfiction."	United States / Belgium	
2026	Poetry	Joyelle McSweeney: "Joyelle McSweeney's wildly imaginative, rageful poems turn decay into sustenance and go on defying death by thriving on rot."	United States	
2026	Poetry	Karen Solie: "Through precise, profound, and wry plainspeaking verse, Karen Solie locates and interrogates the human apprehension of the world of things."	Canada	
