= Beats Per Minute (website) =

American online publication

- One Thirty BPM's main page in January 2011.
- Website type: Music webzine
- Creator: Evan Kaloudis
- Website: beatsperminute.com
- Registration: No
- Launched: October 5, 2008
- Current status: Active

Beats Per Minute (formerly One Thirty BPM) is a New York City– and Los Angeles–based online publication providing reviews, news, media, interviews and feature articles about the music world. Beats Per Minute covers a variety of genres and specializes in rock, hip-hop, and electronic music.

== History ==
Beats Per Minute was founded in late 2008 as a five-man operation and named as a reference to the of Montreal song "Suffer for Fashion". As of 2011, Beats Per Minute had expanded to a staff of about 50 contributors based in the U.S., U.K., New Zealand, Germany, Australia, and Sweden.

The site changed its name from One Thirty BPM to Beats Per Minute in January 2012.

Beats Per Minute's was cited by Hanif Abdurraqib in his Best of 2025 albums feature.

== Ratings ==
It issues music ratings on a 0–100% point scale. As of April 20, 2026, Beats Per Minute music scores were described by Metacritic as 56% of the time higher than most other critic scores. Metacritic reported that out of 1,918 music scores given by the website, the site gave positive reviews to 1,760 of them and gave negative reviews to only 19 of them (1% of the total number of scores given).
