= Daniel Dodd =

English painter and engraver

Daniel Dodd (fl. 1752–c.1780) was an English painter and engraver.

== Life ==
Dodd was a member of the Free Society of Artists, and first appears as an exhibitor at Spring Gardens in 1761. He continued to contribute works there, to 1780. He resided first at Old Ford, near Bow, but subsequently moved into London. Thomas Day the miniature painter is said to have been his pupil.

== Works ==
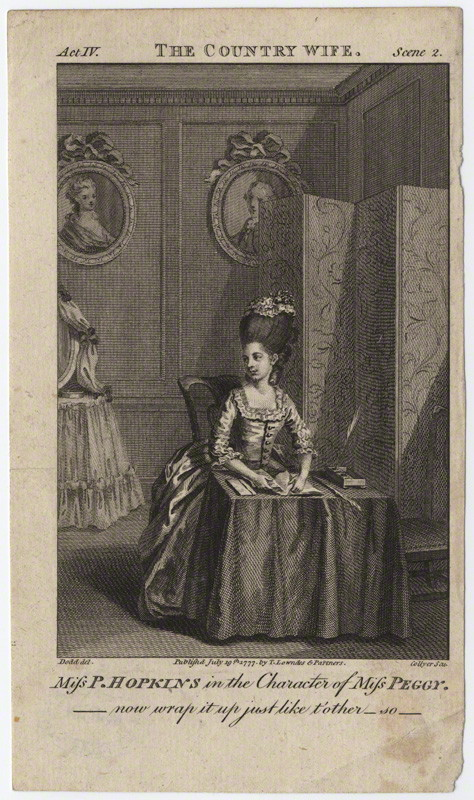
Priscilla Kemble in character as Miss Peggy, in The Country Girl by David Garrick, engraving by Joseph Collyer after Daniel Dodd

Mainly producing portraits in crayons on a small scale, Dodd painted sometimes in oils. His portraits included Margaret Caroline Rudd, and Nathan Potts of the Robin Hood Society (engraved in mezzotint by Butler Clowes).

Some portraits by Dodd were etchings, one being a portrait of Richard Leveridge after Thomas Frye. "Buckhorse" the pugilist was a favourite subject; besides painting his portrait, he engraved it in mezzotint himself.

Dodd designed illustrations for Harrison & Co.'s Novelist's Magazine, George Frederick Raymond's History of England, and other publications. He also drew scenes of fashionable life, crowded with figures: such as A View of the Ball at St. James's on Her Majesty's Birthnight (engraved by Tukey), A View of the Exhibition of the Royal Academy at Somerset House (engraved by William Angus), The Royal Procession to St. Paul's, and The Exhibition of Copley's Picture of the Death of Lord Chatham at the Exhibition Room in Spring Gardens (engraved by Angus).

== Family ==
Dodd had a son D. P. Dodd, and a daughter, who were both artists, and exhibited with the Free Society of Artists from 1768.
