= Hurry Down Sunshine =

2008 memoir by Michael Greenberg

- Author: Michael Greenberg
- Genre: Memoir
- Publisher: Other Press
- Publication date: 2008
- Pages: 234
- ISBN: 978-1590511916
- OCLC: 227016273

Hurry Down Sunshine is a best-selling 2008 memoir by nonfiction writer Michael Greenberg. The book tells the story of the author's daughter and her battle with mental illness.

== Reception ==
The book received attention for both its literary style and its provocative content. In The New York Times, Rachel Donadio's review focussed on Greenberg's attention to New York City, writing that the work was "filled with the kind of characters increasingly rare in a city where real kooks can no longer afford to live." Cultural critic Jacob Appel praised the memoir "one of those extremely rare works of literature that operates well as both a love story and a social indictment—without either aspect interfering with the dramatic force of the other."
