= Olivia Laing =

British writer (born 1977)

- Born: 14 April 1977 (age 49)
- Occupation: Writer
- Notable work: The Garden Against Time, The Lonely City
- Spouse: Ian Patterson (m. 2017)
- Awards: Windham-Campbell Literature Prize (2018)
- Website: www.olivialaing.com

Olivia Laing (born 14 April 1977) is a British writer, novelist and cultural critic. They are the author of five works of non-fiction—To the River (2011), The Trip to Echo Spring (2013), The Lonely City (2016), Everybody (2021), and The Garden Against Time (2024)—as well as an essay collection, Funny Weather (2020), and two novels, Crudo (2017) and The Silver Book (2025). In 2018, they were awarded the Windham-Campbell Literature Prize for non-fiction and in 2019, the 100th James Tait Black Memorial Prize for Crudo. In 2019, they became an elected Fellow of the Royal Society of Literature and in 2025 an Honorary Fellow of the Royal Academy of Arts.

== Early life and education ==
Olivia Laing was born born on 14 April 1977. They grew up in Chalfont St Peter, Buckinghamshire.

Laing enrolled at Sussex University to study English, but dropped out to live on a road protest in Dorset. At the age of 20, they spent three months living alone on an abandoned farm near Brighton, an experience they have described as being formative. In their twenties, Laing trained as a medical herbalist.

== Career ==
Between 2007 and 2009, Laing was Deputy Books Editor of The Observer. They wrote widely on art and culture, including The Guardian, The New York Times and Financial Times.

Laing has written catalogue essays on many contemporary artists, including Derek Jarman, Agnes Martin, David Hockney, Wolfgang Tillmans and Andy Warhol.

Laing is the author of four books of nonfiction, each mixing cultural criticism and memoir with elements of biography, psychoanalysis, and travel writing. Their first book, To the River: A Journey Beneath the Surface, was published in 2011. Walking the length of the Ouse, the river in which Virginia Woolf drowned in 1941, Laing reflects upon Woolf's life and work and, more generally, upon the relationship between history and place, and the difficulties of biography. The book was shortlisted for the Ondaatje Prize and the Dolman Best Travel Book Award.

The Trip to Echo Spring: On Writers and Drinking (2013), a finalist for both the Costa Biography Award and the Gordon Burn Prize, employs a similar approach. Travelling across America, Laing explores the difficult relationship between creativity and alcoholism, placing their own experience growing up in an alcoholic family alongside the lives of male alcoholic writers such as John Cheever, F. Scott Fitzgerald, Raymond Carver and Ernest Hemingway. In the book, they praise literature's "power to map the more difficult regions of human experience and knowledge". According to the judges of the Windham-Campbell Prize, "this power to map the difficult, the shameful, and the grotesque, as well as the beautiful and transcendent, is inherent in her own work".

Their third book, The Lonely City: Adventures in the Art of Being Alone, was aided by research Laing undertook as a recipient of the 2014 Eccles British Library Writer Award and was published in 2016. It was shortlisted for the Gordon Burn Prize and the National Book Critics Circle Award for Criticism. It has been translated into twenty languages. Examining their own experience of solitude during a period living in New York, Laing considers how the culturally stigmatised condition of loneliness provides new insights into the work of numerous artists for whom the creative act became a means of exploring solitude and forging companionship, among them Andy Warhol, Edward Hopper, Henry Darger and David Wojnarowicz. The result is an exploration of the intense feelings of shame that loneliness can provoke as well as a vivid portrait of 1970s and 1980s New York at the peak of the AIDS crisis.

Laing's first novel, Crudo, is a roman-à-clef about the politically turbulent summer of 2017. Written in real time over seven weeks, the novel is also a homage to Kathy Acker, on whom the protagonist is based. It was a New York Times Notable Book of 2018, and was shortlisted for the Gordon Burn Prize and the Goldsmiths Prize. In 2019, Crudo won the 100th James Tait Black Memorial Prize. According to the fiction judge, Dr Alex Lawrie: "This is fiction at its finest: a bold and reactive political novel that captures a raw slice of contemporary history with pace, charm, and wit." Writing in The New Yorker, Alexandra Schwartz described Crudo as "a work of autofiction that captures the apprehension of the present moment." In the New Statesman, Sarah Ditum wrote that Laing "uses her style like a magician uses sleight-of-hand, palming away a hinted-at revelation while your attention has been directed towards the dazzling arc of her sentences".

Funny Weather: Art in an Emergency was published in 2020. It is a collection of essays, reviews and other published work that Laing wrote for a variety of publications, including frieze, BOMB and The Guardian, written between 2011 and 2019. The book discusses artists including Jean-Michel Basquiat, Agnes Martin, Derek Jarman, David Wojnarowicz and Joseph Cornell. Art Quarterly describe each chapter as containing "just the right balance of biographical fact, detailed analysis, political context and keenly felt compassion."

Laing's sixth book, Everybody (2021), examines the body and its discontents by way of the renegade psychoanalyst Wilhelm Reich. It explores the liberation movements of the twentieth century, examining the work and lives of a variety of figures, including Nina Simone, Susan Sontag, Andrea Dworkin and Malcolm X. According to the Financial Times, "Laing's gift for weaving big ideas together with lyrical prose sets her alongside the likes of Arundhati Roy, John Berger and James Baldwin. In other words, she is among the most significant voices of our time."

Laing's seventh book, The Garden Against Time (2024), is an investigation into the idea of paradise that tells the story of their restoration of a walled garden in Suffolk. It was shortlisted for the 2024 Wainwright Prize, Kirkus Prize for non-fiction and Waterstones Book of the Year award.

The Silver Book (2025), Laing's second novel, is set around the making of Fellini's Casanova and Salò, or the 120 Days of Sodom by Pier Paolo Pasolini. It features the costume designer Danilo Donati and concerns the murder of Pasolini in 1975.

In 2025, Laing published Painting Writing Texting, a record of a decade of collaboration with the painter Chantal Joffe.

== Personal life ==
Laing married poet and academic Ian Patterson in 2017. Laing is non-binary.

== Awards and honors ==
- 2014 Eccles British Library Writers Award
- 2018 Windham–Campbell Literature Prize
- 2019 James Tait Black Memorial Prize - Crudo

== Publications ==
=== Non-fiction ===
- To the River: A Journey Beneath the Surface (Canongate, 2011)
- The Trip to Echo Spring: On Writers and Drinking (Canongate, 2013)
- The Lonely City: Adventures in the Art of Being Alone (Canongate, 2016)
- Funny Weather: Art in an Emergency (Picador, 2020)
- Everybody: A Book About Freedom (Picador, 2021)
- The Garden Against Time: In Search of a Common Paradise (Picador, 2024)
- Painting Writing Texting (Mack, 2025)

=== Fiction ===
- Crudo (Picador, 2018)
- The Silver Book (Hamish Hamilton, 2025)
