= Dg nanouk okpik =

Iñupiaq poet

dg nanouk okpik
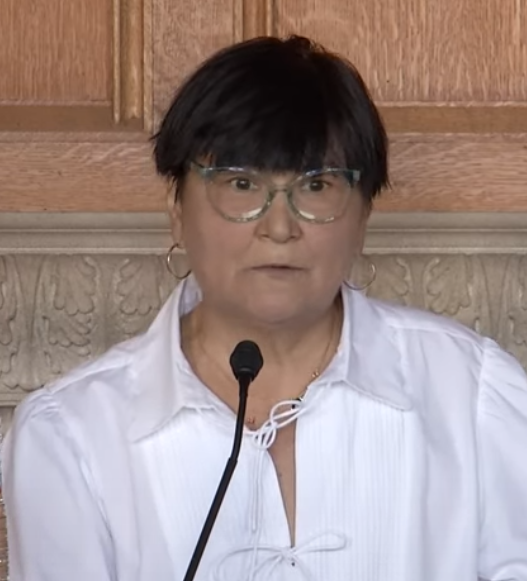
- At UC Berkeley's Lunch Poems in 2023
- Born: Anchorage, Alaska
- Education: Salish Kootenai College (AFA); Institute of American Indian Arts (BFA); University of Southern Maine (MFA)
- Occupation: Poet

dg nanouk okpik is an Iñupiaq poet. She received the American Book Award for her debut poetry collection, Corpse Whale (2012). In 2023 she was the recipient of a Windham Campbell Literature Prize for poetry and a finalist for the Pulitzer Prize in Poetry.

== Education ==
Born in Anchorage and raised by Irish/German adoptive parents, dg nanouk okpik has experienced some of the same hardships faced by other Indigenous women, including urban relocation, poverty, and disrupted access to her culture. She attended the University of Southern Maine, earning an MFA. She was the recipient of the Truman Capote Literary Trust Scholarship. She is also an alumna of the Institute of American Indian Arts.

== Career ==
okpik is a resident advisor at the Santa Fe Indian School. She received the American Book Award for her debut poetry collection, Corpse Whale, which was published in 2012 and received praise from critics. In a review for Studies in American Indian Literatures, Jasmine Johnston described Corpse Whale as "both surreal and mythic", praising okpik's imagery and code-switching between Inuit and English. Diego Báez, writing for Booklist, called it a "captivating debut" and similarly commended okpik's use of Inuit vocabulary.

okpik's writing has been widely anthologized. Among collections including her is The Poem Is You: 60 Contemporary American Poems and How to Read Them by literary critic and poet Stephanie Burt. Her poetry was also part of the collection Sing: Poetry from the Indigenous Americas by Allison Adelle Hedge Coke. as well as Effigies: An Anthology of New Indigenous Writing by the same author.

She was awarded a Windham Campbell Prize for poetry in 2023.

== Awards ==
Year	Text	Award	Result
2012	Corpse Whale	American Book Award	Won
2014	Corpse Whale	Truman Capote Literary Trust Scholarship	Won
2023	Corpse Whale	May Sarton Award	Won
2023	Blood Snow	Pulitzer Prize	Finalist

== Personal life ==
She was raised in Anchorage, Alaska, and currently lives in Santa Fe, New Mexico.

== Published works ==
=== Monographs ===
- 2012: Corpse Whale (University of Arizona Press), ISBN 978-0816526741
- 2022: Blood Snow (Wave Books), ISBN 978-1950268634

=== Anthologies ===
- 2018: New Poets of Native Nations (Graywolf Press), ed. Heid E. Erdrich, ISBN 978-1555979997
- 2011: Sing: Poetry from the Indigenous Americas (University of Arizona Press), ISBN 978-0816528912
- 2009: Effigies: An Anthology of Indigenous Writing from the Pacific Rim (Salt Publishing), ISBN 978-1844714070

=== Selected poetry ===
- 2009: "For-The-Spirits-Who-Have-Rounded-The-Bend IIVAQSAAT"
- 2012: "Cell Block on Chena River"
- 2012: "Warming"
- 2012: "If Oil is Drilled in Bristol Bay"
- 2012: "The Pact with Samna"
- 2012: "Little Brother and the Serpent Samna"
- 2018: "A Year Dot"
- 2018: "Necklaced Whalebone"
- 2018: "Found"
- 2020: "When White Hawks Come"
