= The 11th =

Podcast by Pineapple Street Media

The 11th is an experimental podcast by Pineapple Street Media composed of miniseries by independent collaborators. Each miniseries was released on the 11th of each month.

== Background ==
The show is composed of experimental miniseries created by independent collaborators. Episodes were released on the 11th day of each month.

The first miniseries was called "The Inbox" and was created by Sarah Viren. The second miniseries was called "Time Machine: The Score", which was created by Hanif Abdurraqib. Another miniseries by Sai Sion called "His Saturn Return" is a scifi audio drama that follows an alien who is being put to the test. The audio drama was written and performed by Sion.

== Reception ==
WBEZ included "His Saturn Returns" on their list of the best podcasts of 2022.

=== Awards ===
Award	Date	Recipient	Category	Result	Ref.
Ambies Awards	2022	"Time Machine — The Score"	Best Production and Sound Design	Nominated	
Webby Awards	2023	"His Saturn Return"	Scripted (Fiction)	Won	
Webby Awards	2023	"His Saturn Return"	Original Music Score / Best Sound Design	Honoree	
Webby Awards	2023	The 11th	Experimental & Innovation	Nominated	
ASME National Magazine Award	2023	"Time Machine: The Score"	Podcasting	Won	
Gotham Variety Award	2023	"His Saturn Return"		Won	
Third Coast Award	2022–2023	"His Saturn Return"	Directors' Choice	Won	
