= Ninni Holmqvist =

Translator and author of fiction

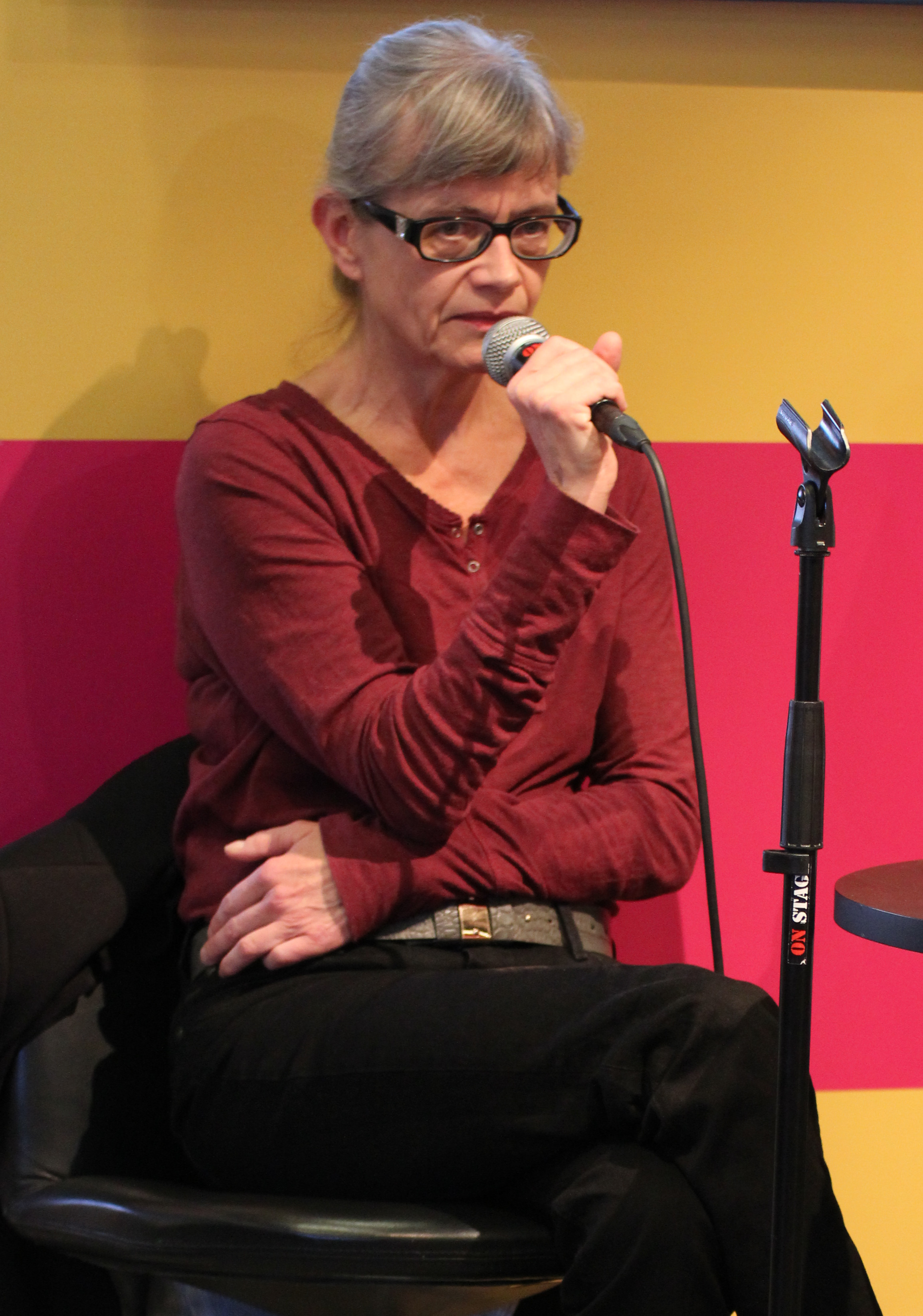
Ninni Holmqvist at the Gothenburg Book Fair 2014

Ninni Holmqvist, born 24 June 1958 in Lund and currently living in Scania, Sweden, is a translator and author of fiction. She has published two novels and two collections of short stories since 1995. Her novel The Unit, (Other Press) a dystopian novel published in 2006 and translated from Swedish into English by Marlaine Delargy with its paperback publication in 2009. The Unit has received critical attention both from major literary reviews and analysis in academic journals.

== Bibliography ==
- The suit (Kostym) 1995
- Something of a lasting nature (Något av bestående karaktär) 1999
- Supporting Roles (Biroller) 2002
- Black Diamonds (Svarta diamanter: elva berättelser om liv och död) 2004
- The Unit (Enhet) Translated into English and published in 2009. Initially published in 2006.
