= Peter Pomerantsev =

British journalist and filmmaker (born 1977)

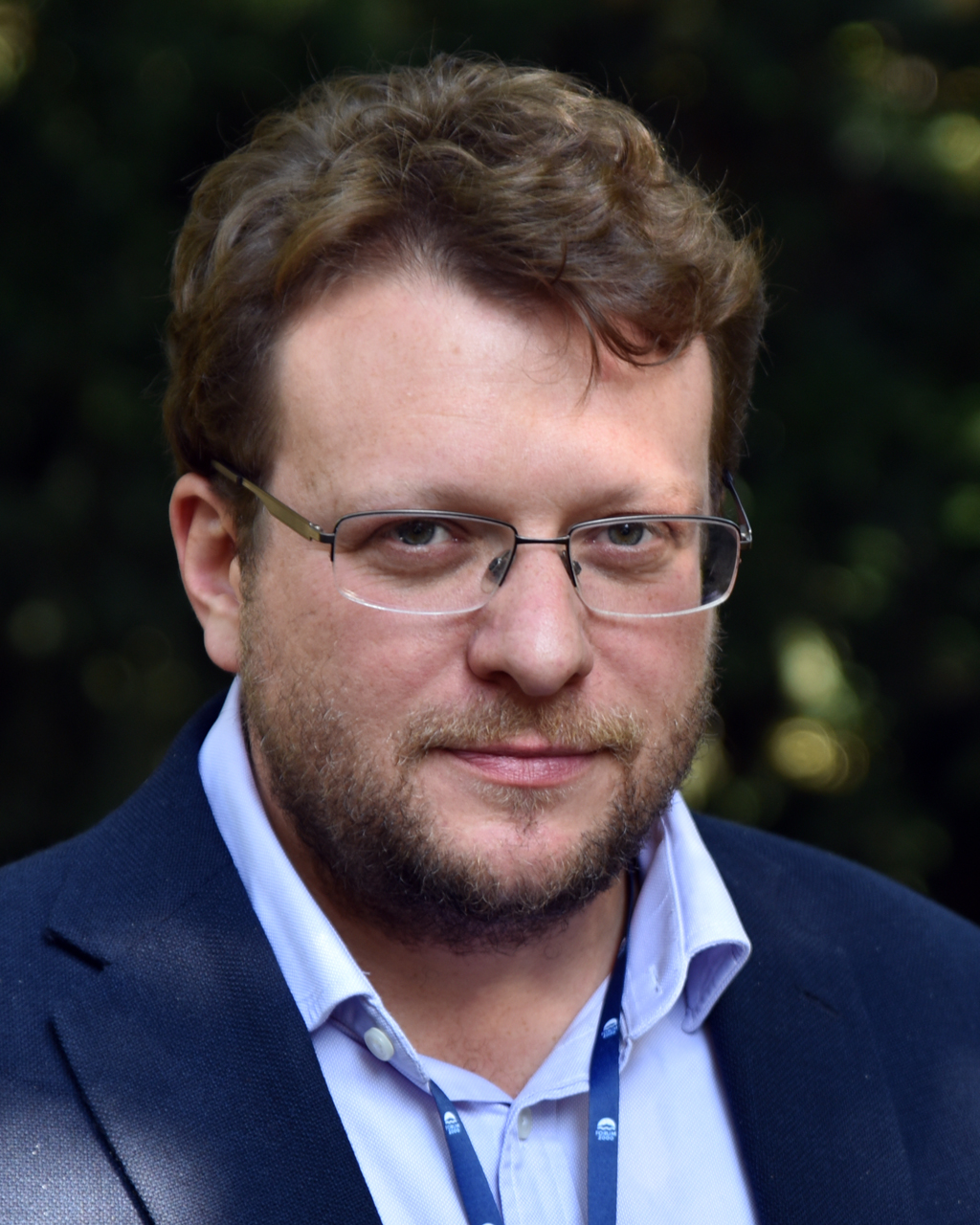
- Pomerantsev in 2019
- Born: Pyotr Igorevich Pomerantsev; 1977 (age 48–49); Kyiv, Ukrainian SSR, Soviet Union
- Education: University of Edinburgh
- Occupation: Journalist
- Known for: Nothing Is True and Everything Is Possible; This Is Not Propaganda

Peter Pomerantsev (Russian: Питер Померанцев; born Pyotr Igorevich Pomerantsev, Пётр Игоревич Померанцев; born 1977) is a Ukrainian-born British journalist, author and TV producer. He is a Senior Fellow at the Institute of Global Affairs at the London School of Economics, where he co-directs the Arena program. He is also an associate editor at Coda Media, a position he has held since at least 2015. Pomerantsev has written two books about Russian disinformation and propaganda—Nothing Is True and Everything Is Possible (2014) and This Is Not Propaganda (2019)—and a third, How to Win an Information War: The Propagandist Who Outwitted Hitler (2024), on Sefton Delmer, a British propagandist during World War II.

== Biography ==
Pomerantsev was born into a Russian speaking family in Kyiv, Ukrainian SSR in 1977. In 1978, he moved with his parents to West Germany, after his father, broadcaster and poet Igor Pomerantsev, was arrested by the KGB for distributing anti-Soviet literature. They later moved to Munich and then London where Igor Pomerantsev worked for the BBC World Service. Pomerantsev's mother, Liana Pomerantsev, is a documentary producer. Her credits include Gulag, which won the Grierson Award for Best British Documentary; The Beslan Siege, which won Prix Italia; and The Train, which won a BAFTA.

Pomerantsev attended Westminster School in London and the European School in Munich. He studied English Literature and German at the University of Edinburgh. After university he moved to Russia in 2001. He attended the Higher Courses for Script Writers and Film Directors in Moscow. He "jumped jobs" between think tanks and was a consultant on European Union projects until he went to film school.

=== Television work ===
Pomerantsev lived largely in Moscow between 2001 and 2010, working in TV. Between 2006 and 2010, following a stint in London, he worked on programs broadcast on Russian entertainment channel TNT. His credits included Creative Producer on 'Привет Пока', the Russian version of the Sony format 'Hello-Goodbye'. Part of the time he was employed at production company 'Potemkin Productions'.

=== Journalism ===
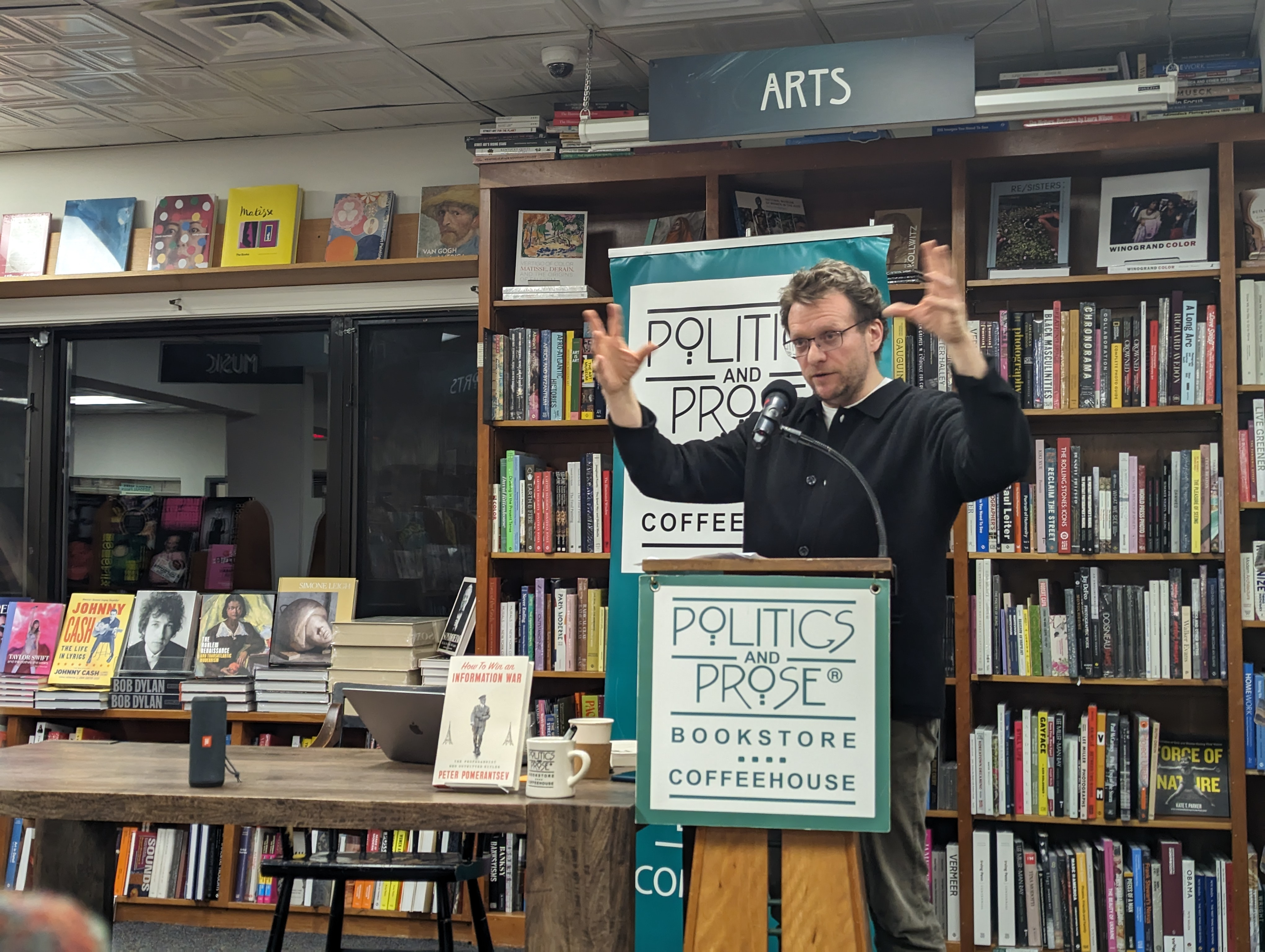
Pomerantsev at Politics and Prose in 2024

Starting in 2011, Pomerantsev wrote about Russia, with articles in Newsweek, The Atlantic Monthly and other magazines. He coined the term "post-modern dictatorship" to describe Vladimir Putin's regime.

Pomerantsev's memoir of his time in Russia, Nothing is True and Everything is Possible: Adventures in Modern Russia, was released by Faber and Faber in the UK in 2015 and Public Affairs in the US in 2014 (where it is known as Nothing is True and Everything is Possible: The Surreal Heart of the New Russia). It has since been translated into over a dozen languages. In the book Pomerantsev provides insight into how the Russian state apparatus uses "black PR" to manipulate truth, while the Russian public — accustomed to the lies of the Soviet regime — remain cynical and assume that all of "Kremlin's reality is scripted". The New York Times noted the "book is written in different genres, a sort of intellectual docudrama. Mr. Pomerantsev concedes that some of the dialogue he quotes is from memory."

Pomerantsev was project chair for the Information Warfare Initiative of the Center for European Policy Analysis. He also led the Beyond Propaganda programme within the Legatum Institute's Transitions Forum, where he was a Senior Fellow. Pomerantsev has been at the fellow of the Institute for Human Sciences, Vienna.

Pomerantsev has given testimony on the subject of information warfare and media development to the US Congress Foreign Affairs Committee, US Senate Committee on Foreign Relations, and the UK Parliament Defence Committee.

== Views and opinions ==
=== Post-modern politics ===
In a short animated film on BBC Newsnight, Pomerantsev introduced the idea of the "post-modern politician". He argued that President Trump and President Putin share a disdain for facts - and that this is part of their appeal. He developed related themes in pieces for Granta and the Financial Times, where he argued that fact-driven political discourse is connected to the idea of a future. Pomerantsev wrote about Putin's information guru Vladislav Surkov, "the hidden author of Putinism". Pomerantsev has been a member of the advisory panel of the Global Disinformation Index.

=== Information warfare and propaganda ===
In a 2014 essay for The Atlantic, "The Menace on Unreality" on the Kremlin's Hall of Mirrors, Pomerantsev explored how information warfare has changed in the 21st century. He has also contributed to think tank studies about propaganda and information war, and edited a series of studies on the subject, including subjects ranging from ISIS' use of social media to media literacy.

=== Brexit and English identity ===
In a 2019 essay for the Prospect Magazine, "I never thought I could be English. Now I am not sure if I want to be," Pomerantsev illustrated the complexity of English identity by his experiences as a Russian-speaking immigrant who was brought from Soviet Ukraine to the United Kingdom as a child. British society, in his view, is prone to deep differentiations according to classes, schools, accents, ethnic origins, religions, and political affiliations. Although the Brexit referendum has added yet greater complexity to this societal split, it has offered Pomerantsev a chance to identify with a part of English people called "Remainers," as opposed to "Brexiteers." However, he thinks of himself as European in the narrow meaning of the EU project rather than an "English Remainer," while speaking against Brexit in the essay.

== Investigation into suicide of Ruslana Korshunova ==
Pomerantsev investigated the suicide of Russian model Ruslana Korshunova for a documentary. He revealed that her death was linked to the Rose of the World. The cult-like group's "training sessions" are modeled after the defunct Lifespring where participants go through grueling physical and mental sessions. Korshunova lost weight and became aggressive, her friends reported after months of training. She then went to New York City, looking for work. On 28 June 2008, she jumped from the balcony of her apartment and died instantly. No signs of a struggle were found in her apartment and her death was ruled as a suicide. She was buried at Khovanskoye Cemetery in Moscow.

== Awards ==
- 2012 Society of Press In Asia 'Excellence in Lifestyle Coverage' Award
- 2015 Samuel Johnson Prize, finalist, Nothing is True and Everything is Possible
- 2015 Pushkin House, shortlist, Nothing is True and Everything is Possible
- 2015 Gordon Burn Prize, shortlist, Nothing is True and Everything is Possible
- 2016 Royal Society of Literature Ondaatje
- 2020 Gordon Burn Prize, This is Not Propaganda
- 2021 Fellow of the Royal Society of Literature
- 2026 Ryszard Kapuściński Award, How to Win an Information War: The Propagandist Who Outwitted Hitler

== Public appearances and podcasts ==
- Start the Week with Andrew Marr, BBC Radio 4
- This American Life, WBEZ
- British Scandal, Wondery

== Bibliography ==
- Nothing Is True and Everything Is Possible: The Surreal Heart of the New Russia
  - Published in the US by PublicAffairs (November 2014), ISBN 978-1-61039-455-0
  - Published in the UK by Faber & Faber (December 2015), ISBN 978-0-57130-802-6
  - Published in German (Nichts ist wahr und alles ist möglich) by Penguin Random House (April 2016), ISBN 978-3-421-04699-4
  - Published in Italian (Niente è vero, tutto è possibile) by Minimum Fax (2018), ISBN 9788875219772
- Pomerantsev, Peter (2017). "Foreward". Black Earth City: A Year in the Heart of Russia. By Hobson, Charlotte. Faber & Faber. ISBN 978-0571340781.
- This Is Not Propaganda: Adventures in the War Against Reality
  - Published in the US by PublicAffairs (August 2019), ISBN 978-1-54176-211-4
  - Published in the UK by Faber & Faber (August 2019), ISBN 978-0-57133-863-4
- How to Win an Information War: The Propagandist Who Outwitted Hitler
  - Published in the US by PublicAffairs (5 March 2024), ISBN 9781541774728
  - Published in the United Kingdom by Faber & Faber (7 March 2024), ISBN 978-0-57136-634-7

== Personal life ==
During his stay in Russia, Pomerantsev married a Russian woman from Moscow. When they moved to London in 2010, their four-year-old daughter Hannah had difficulties in learning English. As of 2019, Pomerantsev and his wife had three children—his two sons are named Issac Pomerantsev and Jacob Pomerantsev—and lived in London.
