= At the Existentialist Café =

2016 book by Sarah Bakewell

At the Existentialist Café: Freedom, Being, and Apricot Cocktails
- First edition (UK)
- Author: Sarah Bakewell
- Illustrator: Andreas Gurewich
- Language: English
- Subject: Existentialism
- Publisher: Other Press (US); Knopf Canada; Chatto & Windus (UK)
- Publication date: 2016
- Publication place: United Kingdom
- Media type: Print (hardcover and paperback)
- Pages: 448
- ISBN: 978-1590514887

At the Existentialist Café: Freedom, Being, and Apricot Cocktails is a 2016 book written by British writer Sarah Bakewell that covers the philosophy and history of existentialism. The book provides an account of the modern day existentialists who came into their own before and during the Second World War. The book discusses the ideas of the phenomenologist Edmund Husserl, and how his teaching influenced the rise of existentialism through the likes of Martin Heidegger, Jean Paul Sartre, and Simone De Beauvoir, who are the main protagonists of the book. The title refers to an incident in which Sartre's close friend and fellow philosopher Raymond Aron startled him when they were in a cafe, by pointing to the glass in front of him and stating, "You can make a philosophy out of this cocktail."

== Summary ==
Bakewell structures At the Existentialist Café by focusing each chapter on a particular philosopher or period within the existentialist movement, starting by introducing the early existentialists Kierkegaard, Nietzsche, Dostoevsky and Kafka, and then moving on to the lives and philosophies of Heidegger, Husserl, Sartre, Beauvoir, Camus, Karl Jaspers, and Merleau-Ponty.

== See also ==
- The Frenchmen, Or, My Life in Theory by Emily Eakin
