= Sarah Viren =

American essayist

- Notable works: Mine (2018), To Name the Bigger Lie (2023)
- Spouse: Marta Tecedor

Website
- sarahviren.com

Sarah Viren is an American essayist best known for her 2018 essay collection Mine. Viren's memoir To Name the Bigger Lie: A Memoir in Two Stories was published in 2023.

== Career ==
In 2016, Viren won the Riverteeth Book Prize which offered publication of her essay collection Mine.

Mine was published in 2018 and was longlisted at the 31st Annual Lammy Finalists in the Lesbian Memoir/Biography category and longlisted for the 2018 PEN/Diamonstein-Spielvogel Award for the Art of the Essay.

In 2020, The New York Times published a personal essay by Viren in which she described that she and her wife, Marta, both academics, were subjects of complaints that they had sexually assaulted students, allegations which Viren claimed to be false; according to Viren, the complaints were made by an academic whom she was prevented from publicly naming per conditions of a lawsuit settlement, and were based on professional jealousy. The essay was also featured on an episode of The New York Times' popular podcast The Daily. It was a finalist for a National Magazine Award in feature writing in 2021.

Viren works as an assistant professor of creative nonfiction at Arizona State University. She's a contributing writing for The New York Times Magazine.

Her 2023 memoir To Name the Bigger Lie was shortlisted for the 2024 Lambda Literary Award for Lesbian Memoir or Biography.

Viren created a miniseries called "The Inbox" for the experimental podcast The 11th.

== Personal life ==
Viren is married to fellow academic Marta Tecedor.

== Works ==
- MINE: Essays (2018). University of New Mexico Press. ISBN 9780826359544.
- To Name the Bigger Lie (2023). Scribner. ISBN 9781982166595.
