= Sarah Bakewell =

British author

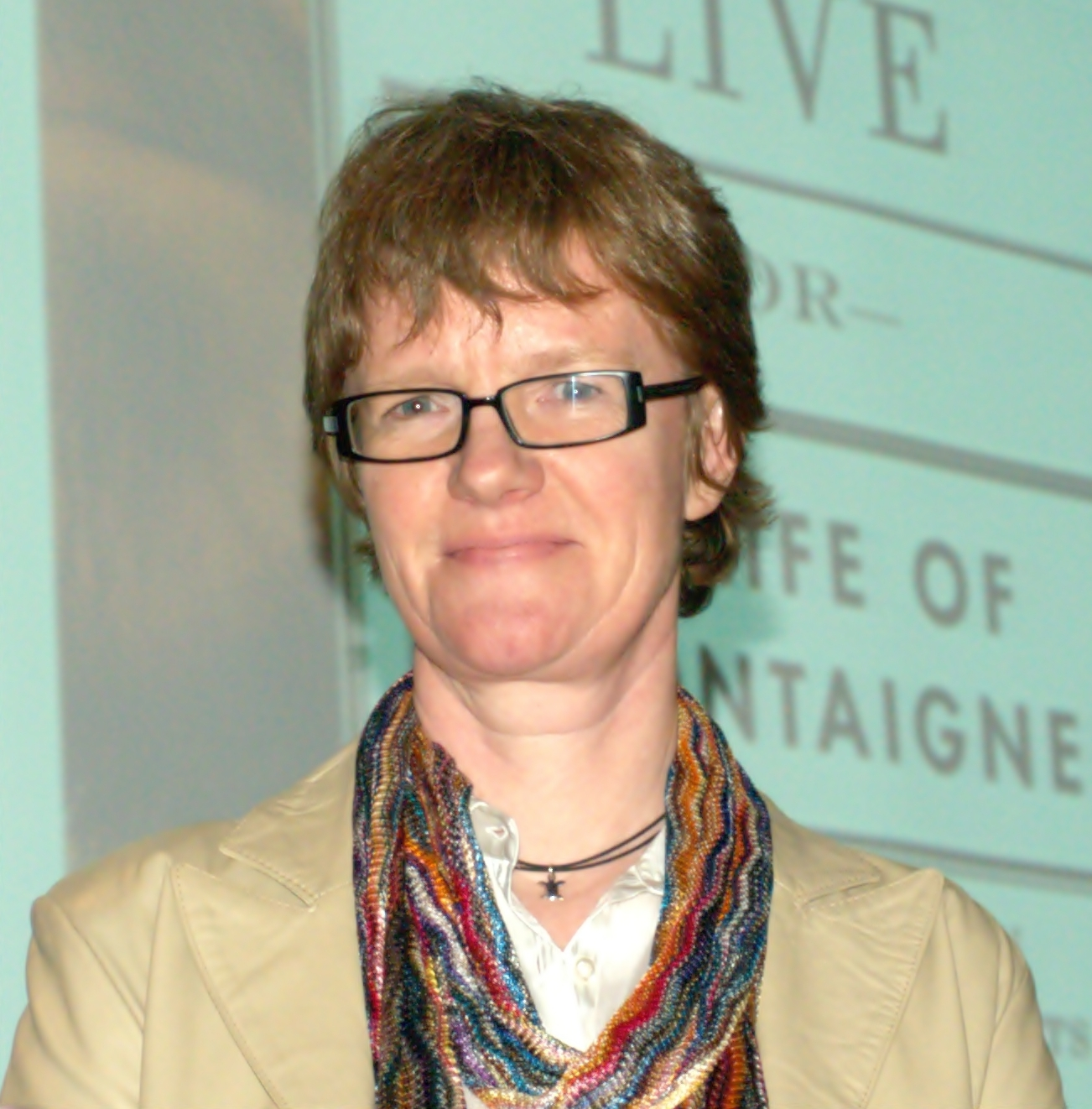
- Bakewell in 2010
- Born: 1963 (age 62–63); Bournemouth, England
- Occupation: Writer
- Writing career
- Notable works: How to Live, At the Existentialist Cafe
- Website: www.sarahbakewell.com

Sarah Bakewell (born 1963) is a British author and professor. She lives in London. She received the Windham–Campbell Literature Prize in Non-Fiction.

== Early life ==
Bakewell was born in the seaside town of Bournemouth, England, where her parents ran a small hotel. When she was five, the family began travelling through India in a camper and continued to do so for two years before settling in Sydney, Australia. There, her father worked as a bookseller and her mother worked as a librarian. As a child, she often wrote, and spent some of her young adulthood working in bookstores.

Bakewell studied philosophy at the University of Essex in England. She embarked on a PhD on philosopher Martin Heidegger, but gave it up to move to London, where she initially found work at a tea-bag factory. Bakewell later completed a post-graduate degree on Artificial Intelligence.

== Career ==
Bakewell began writing again during her job at the Wellcome Library in London as a curator of early printed books, which she began in the early 1990s. She spent a decade at the library, where she came across interesting historical fragments and a pamphlet that would inspire her first book.

The Smart, Bakewell's first book, related the story of an 18th-century forgery trial she came across in the Wellcome collection. In 2002, she quit this job to devote more energy to writing. She published The English Dane, the biography of Danish revolutionary and explorer Jørgen Jørgensen, in 2005.

From 2008 to 2010, Bakewell worked as a part-time cataloger of rare books for the National Trust, cataloging historical book collections around England. In 2010 she published How to Live, a biography of 16th century essayist Michel Eyquem de Montaigne. The book received rave reviews, with The Guardian calling it a "superb, spirited introduction to the master."

Bakewell published At the Existentialist Café: Freedom, Being, and Apricot Cocktails in 2016, a biography of the existentialist movement and its leaders Jean-Paul Sartre, Simone de Beauvoir, Maurice Merleau-Ponty, and Albert Camus. Bakewell was drawn to the existentialist movement at a young age; at age 16, she used some of her birthday money to buy a copy of Sartre's Nausea (1938). Bakewell inserted this personal angle into the work; The New York Times critic Janet Maslin wrote, "As someone who came back to this material by rereading it later in life, she has made her responses part of the story." At the Existentialist Café was named one of the Ten Best Books of 2016 by The New York Times.

== Awards and honours ==
- 2023 Rosalind Franklin Medal and lectureship from Humanists UK
- 2018 Windham–Campbell Literature Prize in Non-Fiction
- 2012 Elected Fellow of the Royal Society of Literature

== Works ==
- Humanly Possible: Seven Hundred Years of Humanist Freethinking, Enquiry, and Hope (Chatto & Windus, UK; Penguin, US; Knopf; Canada, March 2023) is about many extraordinary individuals throughout history who have put rational inquiry, cultural richness, freedom of thought and a sense of hope at the heart of their lives. ISBN 9780735223370
- At the Existentialist Cafe: Freedom, Being, and Apricot Cocktails (Other Press, March 2016) is about the existentialist movement and its leaders: Jean-Paul Sartre, Simone de Beauvoir, Albert Camus, Martin Heidegger, Edmund Husserl, Karl Jaspers and Maurice Merleau-Ponty. London: Chatto & Windus, 2016, ISBN 978-0-701186586
- How to Live: A Life of Montaigne in One Question and Twenty Attempts at an Answer (Chatto & Windus, 2010; Other Press, 2011) is about the life of 16th-century essayist Michel Eyquem de Montaigne. It was reviewed favourably on both sides of the Atlantic. In 2010 the book won the National Book Critics Circle Award in the Biography category, and the Duff Cooper Prize.
- The English Dane (Chatto & Windus, 2005; Vintage, 2006) is about 19th-century Danish adventurer Jørgen Jørgensen, a key player in stirring a revolution in Iceland to break from Denmark's control.
- The Smart: The True Story of Margaret Caroline Rudd and the Unfortunate Perreau Brothers (Chatto & Windus, 2001; Vintage, 2002) is about an 18th-century forgery trial she came across while working at the Wellcome Library.
