= Negroland: A Memoir =

2015 memoir by Margo Jefferson

- First edition
- Author: Margo Jefferson
- Language: English
- Genre: Memoir
- Published: 2015
- Publisher: Pantheon Books
- Publication place: United States
- Media type: Print
- Pages: 248

Negroland: A Memoir is a 2015 book by Margo Jefferson. It is a memoir of growing up in 1950s and 1960s America within a small, privileged segment of black American society known as the black bourgeoisie, or African-American upper class.

== Reception ==
It was described by Dwight Garner in The New York Times as a "powerful and complicated memoir", and by Margaret Busby in The Sunday Times as "utterly compelling", while Anita Sethi wrote in The Observer: "Jefferson fascinatingly explores how her personal experience intersected with politics, from the civil rights movement to feminism, as well as history before her birth." Tracy K. Smith wrote in The New York Times: "The visible narrative apparatus of 'Negroland' highlights its author's extreme vulnerability in the face of her material. It also makes apparent the all-too-often invisible fallout of our nation's ongoing obsession with race and class: Namely, that living a life as an exemplar of black excellence — and living with the survivor's guilt that often accompanies such excellence — can have a psychic effect nearly as deadening and dehumanizing as that of racial injustice itself."

In 2016, Negroland was shortlisted for the Baillie Gifford Prize for Non-Fiction and won the National Book Critics Circle Award in the Autobiography category.

== Awards and honors ==
- 2016 National Book Critics Circle Award (Autobiography), winner.
- June 2016, chosen as a Book of the Week by BBC Radio 4.
- 2016 Chicago Tribune Heartland Prize.

== See also ==
- E. Franklin Frazier's sociological Black Bourgeoisie (first edition in English in 1957 translated from the 1955 French original)
- Lawrence Otis Graham's Our Kind of People: Inside America’s Black Upper Class (2000)
