= Michael Greenberg (writer) =

Michael Greenberg (born 1952) is the author of the best-selling memoir Hurry Down Sunshine (Other Press, 2008), which depicts his daughter's battle with bipolar disorder, and Beg, Borrow, Steal (Other Press, 2009), a New York writer's memoir.

Greenberg is a columnist for The Times Literary Supplement, where he has cultivated a distinctive "quirky New York Jewish voice." He is also a contributor to The Village Voice, The New York Review of Books, Bomb, and The Boston Review.

Greenberg lives in New York City.
