= Nothing Is True and Everything Is Possible =

2014 book

- First edition
- Author: Peter Pomerantsev
- Subject: Russian history
- Publisher: PublicAffairs
- Publication date: 2014
- Pages: 256
- ISBN: 9781610394567

Nothing Is True and Everything Is Possible: The Surreal Heart of the New Russia is a 2014 book by Peter Pomerantsev. It focuses on the political developments in Russia in the early 21st century and the culture of Russian media.

== Background ==
Miriam Elder of The New York Times wrote that the "prism" that Pomerantsev perceived the subject through was his previous career in reality television, to imply the lack of authenticity of Russian institutions.

== Work ==
The author recounts his experiences in Russia when he worked there in the reality television field in the 2000s. Elder describes the work as "Part reportage and part memoir". The author also includes stories of various figures who succeeded or faced hardships in that time period.

Pomerantsev only occasionally explicitly mentions the name of Vladimir Putin. Elder argued that this strategy "can be taken as a suggestion that we focus too much on him, that he’s so big he no longer requires discussion — or that we do not and cannot ever know who he truly is, so why even bother?"

Tony Wood of The Guardian wrote that the book shows that the "roots" of the psychological order was "the tumult and delirium of the country’s post-Soviet transformations".

== Reception ==
Megan McDonogh of the Washington Post wrote that the work is "gripping and unsettling".

== See also ==
- This Is Not Propaganda, 2019 book by the author
