= Adam Ehrlich Sachs =

American writer

Adam Ehrlich Sachs (born 1986) is an American writer. He has published three books: Inherited Disorders (2016), The Organs of Sense (2019), and Gretel and the Great War (2024). In 2018, he received a National Endowment for the Arts fellowship, and in 2026 he received the Windham-Campbell Prize for fiction.

== Early life and education ==
Sachs was born in Boston and attended Harvard University, where he wrote for the Harvard Lampoon. He has a bachelor's degree in atmospheric science and a master's in the history of science.

== Career ==
Sachs's work has been published in The New Yorker, n+1, and Harper’s.

As of 2026, Sachs has published three books. His first book, Inherited Disorders, was published with Regan Arts in 2016. It is a collection of stories about sons and their fathers. It was a finalist for the 2017 Sami Rohr Prize for Jewish Literature. In 2019, Sachs published the novel The Organs of Sense, which tells the story of a blind astronomer who predicts a solar eclipse. It was translated into Portuguese and French. Sachs's novel Gretel and the Great War was published with Farrar, Straus and Giroux in 2024. It is a collection of bedtime stories told by a man to his daughter.

In 2018, Sachs received a National Endowment for the Arts fellowship, and in 2026, he received the Windham-Campbell Prize for fiction.

== Bibliography ==
- —— (2016). Inherited Disorders. New York: Regan Arts. ISBN 9781682450154.
- —— (2019). The Organs of Sense. New York: Farrar, Straus and Giroux. ISBN 9780374227371.
- —— (2024). Gretel and the Great War. New York: Farrar, Straus and Giroux. ISBN 9780374227371.
