= Other Press =

American independent publisher

- Founded: 1998
- Founders: Judith Feher Gurewich and Michael Moskowitz
- Country of origin: United States
- Headquarters location: New York City
- Distribution: Penguin Random House Publisher Services
- Publication types: Books
- Official website: www.otherpress.com

Other Press is an independent publisher of literary fiction and non-fiction, based in New York City. Founded in 1998 to publish academic and psychoanalytic titles, Other Press has since expanded to publish novels, short stories, nonfiction, poetry, and memoirs. Dedicated to publishing literature at its finest, Other Press emphasizes storytelling and exploring the limits of knowledge and imagination.

== Books and authors ==
Other Press has published books by contemporary American authors as well as translated works from around the world. They publish books from a wide range of authors such as Simon Mawer, Hervé Le Tellier, Peter Stamm, Sarah Bakewell, Michael Greenberg, Ninni Holmqvist, Michael Crummey, Atiq Rahimi, Erri De Luca, Saleem Haddad, Bruce Bauman, and Alberto Moravia.

Some of their best-known titles include:

- Simon Mawer, The Glass Room
- Sarah Bakewell, How to Live (biography)
- Michael Greenberg, Hurry Down Sunshine
- Ninni Holmqvist, The Unit
- Michael Crummey, Galore
- Kamel Daoud, The Meursault Investigation (translation by John Cullen)
- Sarah Bakewell, At the Existentialist Cafe
