= Paul Mendez =

British writer (born 1982)

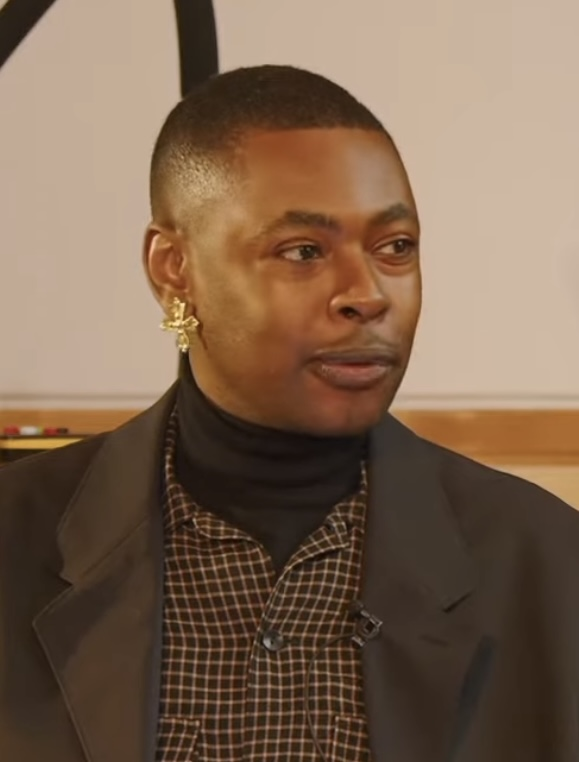
- Mendez at the British Library in 2024
- Born: 1982 (age 43–44); Dudley, West Midlands, England
- Occupation: Author
- Writing career
- Notable work: Rainbow Milk (2020)

Paul Mendez (born 1982) is a British writer. They are currently based in London, U.K. They wrote the 2020 semi-autobiographical novel Rainbow Milk.

Mendez contributes regularly to The London Review of Books and other publications for which they have written for publications include The Times Literary Supplement, Attitude, Esquire, The Face and British Vogue.

== Biography ==
Mendez was born in Dudley, West Midlands, England, to a second-generation Jamaican-British family and was raised as a Jehovah's Witness. Disfellowshipped for their sexuality, Mendez left their parents' house at the age of seventeen and began their studies in engineering at the University of Greenwich. Mendez dropped out after nine months but remained in Tonbridge before moving to Birmingham in 2003 and then London in 2004 to study acting. They became a sex worker.

In 2012, Mendez met Sharmaine Lovegrove at a party and when she became a publisher at Dialogue Books, Mendez sent her the manuscript that would become their debut novel Rainbow Milk, released in 2020. It received positive critical attention, being shortlisted for the Gordon Burn Prize, Jhalak Prize, Polari Prize and the Fiction Debut category of the British Book Awards, and was an Observer Top Ten Debut choice.

Mendez studied for an MA in Black British Writing at Goldsmiths, University of London.

Mendez lives in Hampstead, London. They began a relationship with novelist Alan Hollinghurst in 2018, which has since ended.
