= How to Live (biography) =

2010 book by Sarah Bakewell

How to Live, or a life of Montaigne in one question and twenty attempts at an answer
- Author: Sarah Bakewell
- Language: English
- Genre: Biography, Self-help, Non-fiction
- Publisher: Chatto & Windus (UK); Other Press (US)
- Publication date: 2010 (UK); 2011 (US)
- Pages: 416 pages
- ISBN: 978-1-59051-483-2
- Preceded by: The English Dane

How to Live, or a life of Montaigne in one question and twenty attempts at an answer is a book by Sarah Bakewell, first published by Chatto & Windus in 2010, and by Other Press on September 20, 2011. It is about the life of the 16th-century French nobleman, wine grower, philosopher, and essayist Michel Eyquem de Montaigne. In it, Bakewell "roughly maps out Montaigne's life against the questions he raises along the way," drawing the answers to these questions from his Essays.

== Contents ==
According to the book's webpage posted by Other Press, How to Live concerns the following: "How to get along with people, how to deal with violence, how to adjust to losing someone you love—such questions arise in most people’s lives. They are all versions of a bigger question: How do you live? This question obsessed Renaissance writers, none more than Michel Eyquem de Montaigne, considered by many to be the first truly modern individual. He wrote free-roaming explorations of his thoughts and experience, unlike anything written before. More than four hundred years later, Montaigne’s honesty and charm still draw people to him. Readers come to him in search of companionship, wisdom, and entertainment —and in search of themselves. Just as they will to this spirited and singular biography."

In addition to summarizing Montaigne's life and work, How to Live offers an ideological context, discussing the Stoics, Epicureans, and Sceptics, and their cultivation of prosoche ("mindfulness") through ataraxia ("equilibrium," or having control over your emotions). It also offers a historical context, explaining Montaigne's time of "soured ideals, when high Renaissance hopes, in Bakewell's words, 'dissolved into violence, cruelty and extremist theology.'"

Bakewell also provides her own commentary on Montaigne's life and work. For example, she asserts that the idea of writing about oneself was invented by Michel de Montaigne, and that this is one of the reasons his teachings are still relevant today, in particular to the many bloggers who are following his example, knowingly or not, by writing about themselves. She also suggests that the empathy readers have historically felt with him "derives partly from the free-style form of the prose as it follows the 'thousand paths' of one man's 'random' reasoning, and partly from the author's confessed inadequacy." Another example of her commentary is that she suggests his unconventional education of only being allowed to speak Latin “benefited him in exactly the areas where it also damaged him,” making him an independent thinker, but also making him detached.

== Reception ==
How to Live was awarded the 2010 National Book Critics Circle Award for Biography, and generally was received well.

It has been praised in its capacity as a literary self-help book. In his review of the book in The Guardian, Adam Thorpe wrote that it "skillfully plucks a life-guide from the incessant flux of Montaigne's prose," while Denis Haritou calls it "the most literate “self-help” book that you’ll ever find" in his introduction to Bakewell's article on Three Guys One Book. Similarly, in his review of the book in The Guardian, Nicholas Lezard writes that "Bakewell's title suggests something that might belong in the self-help section of a mainstream bookstore – and I did fear something de Bottonesque – but she approaches her subject very much in a spirit of which he would have approved."

Bakewell's writing voice and enthusiasm about Montaigne have also been praised. In his review of the book in The Independent, Michael Bywater writes that "Sarah Bakewell embraces [Montaigne's] exuberant digressiveness with delight and obvious profound affection. It's rare to come across a biographer who remains so deliciously fond of her subject. She turns her extensive research towards making the reader not just know Montaigne but love him.... Bakewell pulls off the great trick of writing Montaigne in both the context of his own time and of subsequent ages. If you know his work, How to Live will delight and illuminate. If you don't, the book stands splendidly alone, as a picture of a man worth knowing, and will certainly turn you to the Essays. In short, Montaigne has here the biography he deserves, and would have enjoyed its unconventional structure.... Bakewell makes no attempt to efface herself, yet her vivid presence never obscures his. It's rather like having a conversation about a mutual friend, with one who knows him much better." Meanwhile, in his introduction to Bakewell's article on Three Guys One Book, Denis Haritou writes that "Reading How to Live is like wandering in a sun-dappled forest of literature. There are so many paths to take, so many hints of other great writers to explore, that you could never track them all down from one reading. This book’s a keeper."
