= Margo Jefferson =

American writer and academic (born 1947)

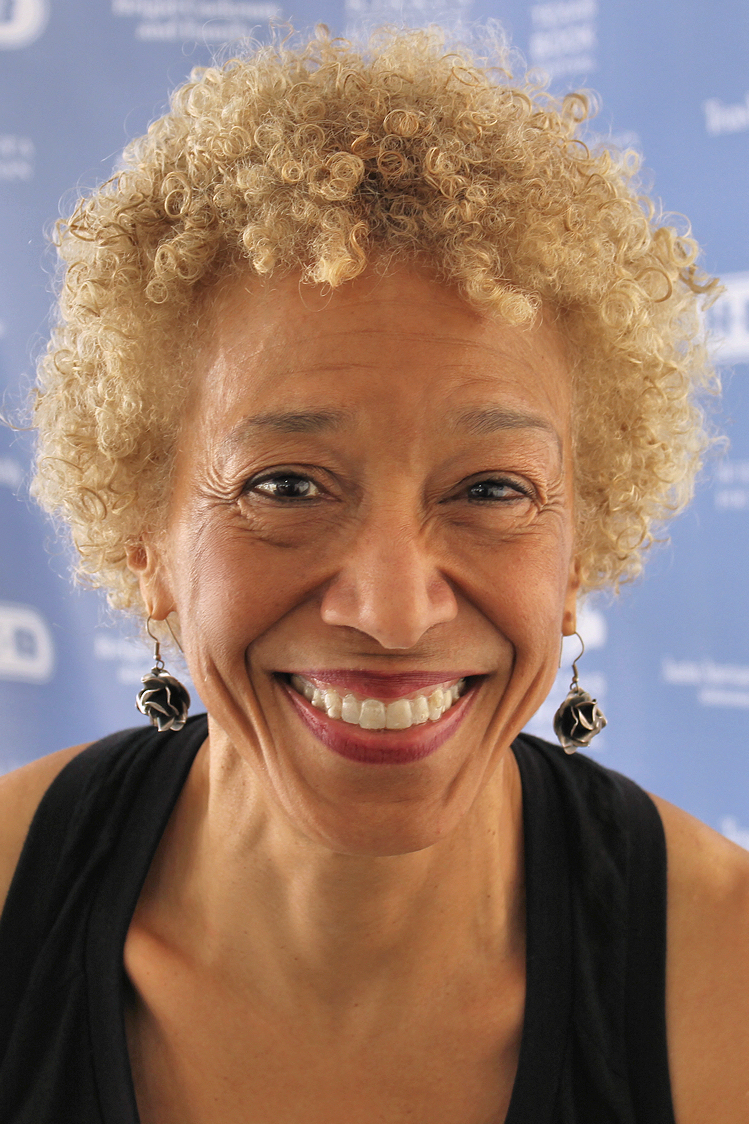
- Jefferson at the 2015 Texas Book Festival
- Born: Margo Lillian Jefferson; October 17, 1947 (age 78)
- Education: Brandeis University (BA); Columbia University (MS)
- Occupations: Writer; critic; journalist; professor
- Writing career
- Period: 1973–present
- Genres: Memoir; journalism; criticism
- Notable work: Negroland: A Memoir (2015)
- Notable awards: Pulitzer Prize for Criticism; National Book Critics Circle Award; Windham-Campbell Literature Prize; Rathbones Folio Prize

Margo Lillian Jefferson (born October 17, 1947) is an American writer and academic. Also a journalist, writing since 1993 for The New York Times, she was awarded the Pulitzer Prize for Criticism in 1995. Other publications for which she has written include Vogue, New York Magazine, The Nation, and Guernica.

== Biography ==
Jefferson received her B.A. degree from Brandeis University, where she graduated cum laude, and her M.S. from the Columbia University Graduate School of Journalism. She became an associate editor at Newsweek in 1973 and stayed at the magazine until 1978. She then served as an assistant professor at the Department of Journalism and Mass Communication at New York University from 1979 to 1983 and from 1989 to 1991. Since then, Jefferson has taught at the Columbia University School of the Arts, where she is now professor of professional practice in writing. Jefferson also taught at The New School's Eugene Lang College of Liberal Arts.

She joined The New York Times in 1993, initially as a book reviewer, then went on to win the Pulitzer Prize for Criticism in 1995. She also served as the newspaper's theater critic in 2004. In addition to the Times, she has written for Vogue, New York Magazine, The Nation, Guernica, and the SoHo Weekly News.

Jefferson has a longstanding interest in jazz, and appeared in Ken Burns' 2001 television documentary series about the history of the music.

=== Writing ===
Jefferson's 2006 book, On Michael Jackson, was described by Publishers Weekly as a "slim, smart volume of cultural analysis". According to Lucy Scholes in The Independent: "The excellent On Michael Jackson is not a straightforward biography, nor is it an attempt to claim either his innocence or his guilt when it comes to the child abuse scandals that, although he was acquitted, haunt his afterlife. A 'deciphering' is probably the most accurate description of the book, the shrewd playfulness of Jefferson's prose the perfect vehicle for analysis that's as smart as it is readable."

Jefferson's autobiographical book, Negroland: A Memoir, was published in 2015. It was described by Dwight Garner in The New York Times as a "powerful and complicated memoir", and by Margaret Busby in The Sunday Times as "utterly compelling", while Anita Sethi wrote in The Observer: "Jefferson fascinatingly explores how her personal experience intersected with politics, from the civil rights movement to feminism, as well as history before her birth." Tracy K. Smith wrote in The New York Times: "The visible narrative apparatus of 'Negroland' highlights its author's extreme vulnerability in the face of her material. It also makes apparent the all-too-often invisible fallout of our nation's ongoing obsession with race and class: Namely, that living a life as an exemplar of black excellence — and living with the survivor's guilt that often accompanies such excellence — can have a psychic effect nearly as deadening and dehumanizing as that of racial injustice itself." In 2016, Negroland was shortlisted for the Baillie Gifford Prize for Non-Fiction and won the National Book Critics Circle Award in the Autobiography category.

Jefferson is a contributor to the 2019 anthology New Daughters of Africa, edited by Margaret Busby.

In 2022, Jefferson was the recipient of a Windham-Campbell Literature Prize in the category of non-fiction. Her book Constructing a Nervous System was a finalist for ALA 2023 Carnegie Medal and the 2023 National Book Critics Circle award in criticism. The book won both the overall and non-fiction categories of the Rathbones Folio Prize.

== Awards ==
Year	Recognized work	Award	Category	Result	Ref
1995	"For her book reviews and other cultural criticism."	Pulitzer Prize	Criticism	Won	
2016	Negroland	Baillie Gifford Prize	—	Shortlisted	
2016	Negroland	National Book Critics Circle Award	Memoir	Won	
2022	—	Windham–Campbell Literature Prize	Non-fiction	Won	
2023	Constructing a Nervous System	Rathbones Folio Prize	Memoir	Won	

== Bibliography ==
=== Books ===
- On Michael Jackson. New York: Pantheon. 2006. ISBN 978-0-375-42326-0.
- Negroland: A Memoir. New York: Pantheon. 2015. ISBN 978-0307378453.
- Constructing a Nervous System. New York: Pantheon. 2022. ISBN 978-1524748173.

=== Selected essays and reporting ===
- "Ripping Off Black Music", Harper's Magazine, January 1973.
- "Seducified by a Minstrel Show", The New York Times, May 22, 1994.
- "On Writers and Writing; Authentic American", The New York Times, February 18, 2001.
- "On the Home Front, the Personal Becomes Theatrical (and Political, Too)", The New York Times, December 11, 2004.
- "Some permutations of we : criticism that comes close to home". The Believer. 11 (3): 22–24. March–April 2013.
- "How Michelle Obama expanded the definition of a first lady", The Guardian, January 6, 2017.
- "No Cinderella: Margo Jefferson on the real Meghan Markle", The Guardian, May 5, 2018.
- "Was I in denial? Margo Jefferson on Michael Jackson's legacy", The Guardian, June 7, 2019.
