= Hanif Abdurraqib =

American poet and essayist (born 1983)

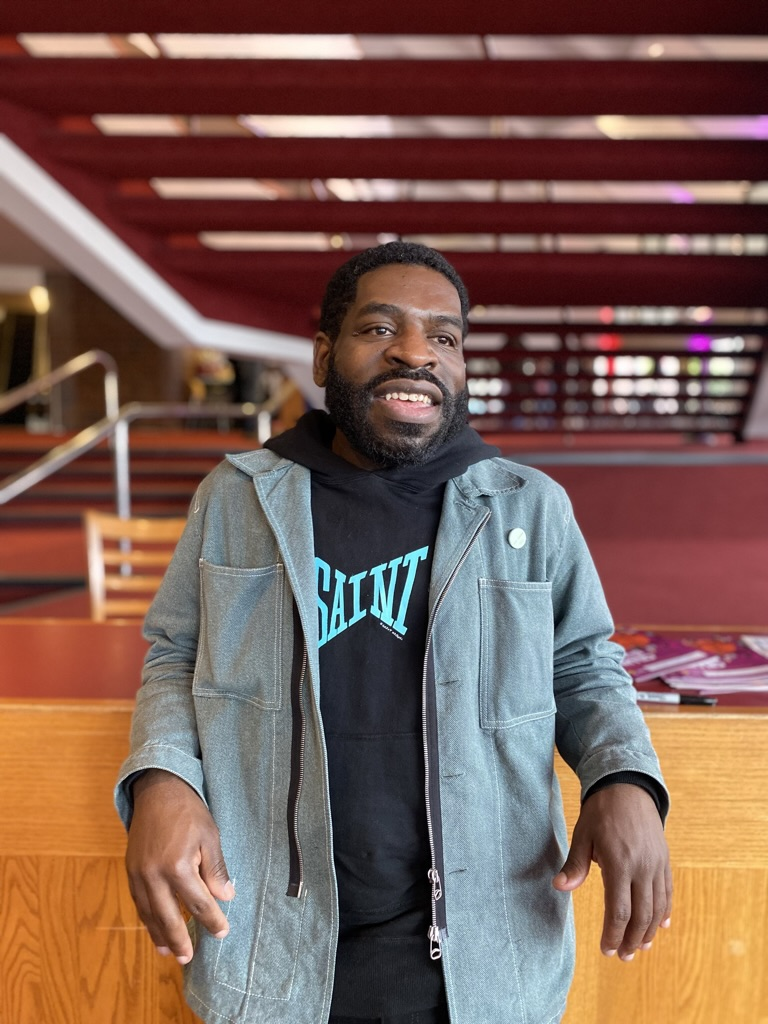
- Abdurraqib at CityLit 2023 at the Meyerhoff Symphony Hall in Baltimore, Maryland
- Born: 1983 (age 42–43); Columbus, Ohio, U.S.
- Education: Capital University
- Occupations: Poet; music critic
- Writing career
- Genres: Poetry; essays; non-fiction
- Subjects: Music; culture; identity
- Notable works: A Little Devil in America: Notes in Praise of Black Performance; The Crown Ain't Worth Much; They Can't Kill Us Until They Kill Us; Go Ahead in the Rain
- Notable awards: MacArthur Fellow
- Website: www.abdurraqib.com

Hanif Abdurraqib (formerly Hanif Willis-Abdurraqib; born 1983) is an American poet, essayist, and cultural critic. His first essay collection, They Can't Kill Us Until They Kill Us, was published in 2017. His 2021 essay collection A Little Devil in America: Notes in Praise of Black Performance received the 2022 Andrew Carnegie Medal for Excellence. Abdurraqib received a MacArthur Fellowship in 2021.

Abdurraqib's poetry works include the 2016 poetry collection The Crown Ain't Worth Much and the 2019 collection A Fortune for Your Disaster. Abdurraqib's 2019 non-fiction book on the American hip-hop group A Tribe Called Quest, Go Ahead in the Rain: Notes on A Tribe Called Quest, was longlisted for the 2019 National Book Award.

== Early life ==
Abdurraqib was born and raised in Columbus, Ohio. He was raised Muslim. When Abdurraqib was 13, his mother died from an abnormal heartbeat caused by her bipolar medicine. He graduated from Beechcroft High School in 2001. He then attended Capital University, where he earned a degree in marketing and played on the soccer team.

== Career ==
=== Poetry ===
Columbus is the setting for Abdurraqib's first book, a poetry collection called The Crown Ain't Worth Much (Button Poetry, July 2016). Publishers Weekly's review noted, "When Willis-Abdurraqib meditates on the dangers of being young and black in America, the power of his poetry is undeniable". The Indiana Review called the collection "expansive and rich...compassionate, elegiac." Fusion called his "poetry a crash course in emotional honesty." Writing of the collection's titular poem, The Huffington Post said Abdurraqib's "chilling take on black death is heartbreakingly true."

Abdurraqib is a Pushcart Prize nominee and a Callaloo Creative Writing Fellow. PBS's Articulate with Jim Cotter described Abdurraqib as "of a generation that is helping to redefine poetry". Blavity called Abdurraqib one of "13 Young Black Poets You Should Know". He is a poetry editor at Muzzle Magazine and a founder, with Eve Ewing, of the Echo Hotel poetry collective. He edited an anthology of poems about pop music called Again I Wait For This To Pull Apart (FreezeRay Press, 2015). In April 2017 his chapbook Vintage Sadness had a limited edition release by Big Lucks, selling out its print run of 500 copies in just under six hours. In August 2017, he was named the managing editor of Button Poetry. On September 3, 2019, Tin House released Abdurraqib's second poetry collection, A Fortune for Your Disaster.

Abdurraqib was a visiting poet teaching in the MFA program at Butler University during the fall of 2018.

=== Prose ===
Abdurraqib's writing has appeared in The Fader, The New York Times, and Pitchfork, as well as previously serving as a columnist at MTV News, writing about music, culture, and identity. The Huffington Post named his essay on Fetty Wap's song "Trap Queen" to its list of "The Most Important Writing From People of Color in 2015." Discussing Abdurraqib's essay on the late Muhammad Ali as inspiration to a generation of hip-hop artists, critic Ned Raggett called the piece a "standout" among the many elegies.

Abdurraqib's essay collection They Can't Kill Us Until They Kill Us was published in November 2017 by Two Dollar Radio. The Chicago Tribune named it to a list of "25 must-read books" for the fall of 2017 and Publishers Weekly gave it a starred review, calling the collection "mesmerizing and deeply perceptive". The book also received favorable reviews from the Chicago Tribune and The Washington Post (where Pete Tosiello described They Can't Kill Us as "a breathtaking collection of largely music-focused essays"), and The New York Times Magazine featured a passage from the collection in the magazine's "New Sentences" column. A special five-year anniversary edition of the collection was to be released on November 15, 2022, featuring three new essays and an audiobook version recorded by Abdurraqib himself.

Abdurraqib published Go Ahead in the Rain: Notes to A Tribe Called Quest in 2019 as part of University of Texas Press's American Music Series, edited by Jessica Hopper, David Menconi, and Oliver Wang. It debuted at number 13 on The New York Times bestseller list for paperback non-fiction and received strongly favorable reviews from critics. Reviewers stressed the accomplishment of integrating music history with both a broader history and a more personal one. Writing for Publishers Weekly, Ed Nawotka called the book "part academic monograph on the group and its music, part pocket history of hip-hop, part memoir, and part epistolary elegy. It is a book that conveys the wonder of being a fan and the visceral impact of experiencing the feeling of having oneself reflected back in music and pop culture." For NPR Lily Meyer praised Abdurraqib's "seemingly limitless capacity to share what moves him, which means that to read Go Ahead in the Rain, you don't need to be a Tribe Called Quest fan: Abdurraqib will make you one." The book was a finalist for the Kirkus Prize in nonfiction and longlisted for the National Book Award for Nonfiction.

In January 2018, Abdurraqib announced he had signed a two-book deal with Random House; announced as a nonfiction book They Don't Dance No' Mo' on the history of black performance in the United States, to be published in 2020 and an essay collection following up on They Can't Kill Us Until They Kill Us.

About They Can't Kill Us, a review from Booklist wrote: "Abdurraqib writes with uninhibited curiosity and insight about music and its ties to culture and memory, life and death, on levels personal, political, and universal... Abdurraqib’s poignant critiques, a catalog of the current moment and all that preceded it, inspire us to listen with our whole selves."

The first book in the Random House deal was retitled A Little Devil in America: Notes in Praise of Black Performance and was released March 30, 2021. A Little Devil received a starred prepublication review in Publishers Weekly, which wrote: "Filled with nuance and lyricism, Abdurraqib's luminous survey is stunning." Kirkus called the book: "A thoughtful memoir rolled into a set of joined essays on life, death, and the Black experience in America....Another winner from Abdurraqib, a writer always worth paying attention to." Abdurraqib himself describes A Little Devil in America as "a catalogue of excitements". The book was awarded the 2022 Andrew Carnegie Medal for Excellence in Nonfiction. It was also awarded the 2021 Gordon Burn Prize.

Abdurraqib's 2024 book, There's Always This Year: On Basketball and Ascension, was longlisted for the 2024 National Book Award for Nonfiction.

=== Podcasts ===
In 2021, Abdurraqib launched a weekly podcast called "Object of Sound" with Sonos Radio. The music focused podcast features interviews and curated playlists by Abdurraqib and guests.

Abdurraqib created a miniseries called "Time Machine: The Score" for the podcast The 11th.

== Honors ==
In 2017, Abdurraqib received an honorary degree in human ecology from the College of the Atlantic. The Crown Ain't Worth Much was a finalist for the Eric Hoffer Book Award and nominated for a 2017 Hurston/Wright Legacy Award. They Can't Kill Us Until They Kill Us was named a best book of 2017 by numerous outlets, including NPR, Pitchfork, the Los Angeles Review, the Chicago Tribune, Stereogum, National Post, Paste, CBC, and Esquire. Go Ahead in the Rain: Notes to A Tribe Called Quest was a finalist for the 2019 Kirkus Prize in nonfiction and was longlisted for the 2019 National Book Award for Nonfiction.

In 2021 Cbus Libraries commissioned The People's Mural of Columbus, which features Abdurraqib and was completed in August of that year in the writer's hometown of Columbus, Ohio. Abdurraqib's book, A Little Devil in America: Notes in Praise of Black Performance, won the Gordon Burn Prize in 2021 and the Andrew Carnegie Medals for Excellence in 2022.

Abdurraqib was awarded a MacArthur Fellowship in 2021 and a Windham-Campbell Prize in 2024.

In 2025, Abdurraqib's book There's Always This Year: On Basketball and Ascension received the 2024 National Book Critics Circle Award for Criticism and the 2025 Audie Award for Nonfiction.

In 2026 he was named as recipient of the $75,000 CAD Weston International Award, a career achievement prize for international writers presented by the Writers' Trust of Canada.

== Personal life ==
Abdurraqib married in 2014 and lived with his wife in New Haven, Connecticut, until they divorced in 2016. He returned to Columbus, Ohio, in 2017.

== Bibliography ==
=== Books ===
- Again I Wait For This To Pull Apart (as Hanif Willis-Abdurraqib; FreezeRay Press, 2015)
- The Crown Ain't Worth Much (as Hanif Willis-Abdurraqib; Button Poetry, 2016) ISBN 978-1-943735-04-4
- Vintage Sadness (as Hanif Willis-Abdurraqib; Big Lucks, 2017)
- They Can't Kill Us Until They Kill Us (Two Dollar Radio, 2017)
- Go Ahead in the Rain (University of Texas Press, 2019)
- A Fortune For Your Disaster (Tin House, 2019)
- A Little Devil in America (Random House, 2021)
- There's Always This Year (Random House, 2024)
- I'm Always Looking Up And You're Jumping (Random House, 2027)

=== New Yorker columns ===
- Abdurraqib, Hanif (April 15, 2021). "The timeless pleasures of Dawoud Bey's street portraits". Photo Booth. The New Yorker. (Note: Available on website only.)
- Abdurraqib, Hanif (May 16, 2025). "In Defense of Despair". Essay. The New Yorker.

———————

Bibliography notes
