= Rainbow Milk =

2020 novel by Paul Mendez

- First edition
- Author: Paul Mendez
- Language: English
- Genre: Semi-autobiographical; Bildungsroman
- Publisher: Dialogue Books
- Publication date: 23 April 2020
- Publication place: United Kingdom
- Pages: 336
- ISBN: 978-0-385-54706-2

Rainbow Milk is a semi-autobiographical novel written by British writer Paul Mendez and first published by a Little, Brown and Company imprint in 2020. Mendez' debut novel tells the story of Jesse McCarthy, a Black gay man who flees his home after being outed by members of his community.

== Reception ==
In a review for The Irish Times, Sarah Gilmartin commented on the opening section of the novel, which narrates the life of a Jamaican immigrant trying to settle in the Black Country during the 1950s. Gilmartin said the section "stands alone as a virtuosic piece of writing – urgent, original and heartbreaking." Gilmartin praised Mendez' "ear for dialects" throughout the book, which lets the reader get closer to the characters. The reviewer said the "early parts of Jesse’s life make for an engrossing read," but said the author should have made obvious the connection between the initial chapter and McCarthy's story sooner. Gilmartin also criticised the overuse of shocking and sexual details, which eventually lose impact, and noted that "[p]acing is a big issue" in the novel.

Author Tony Leuzzi, reviewing for The Brooklyn Rail, said it was one of the "more convincing debuts" he has read, as well as "one of the more humane." Leuzzi commented on Mendez' writing ability in letting the main character "articulate his thoughts and feelings without exploiting his struggles for cheap consumption." In his text, Leuzzi also discussed the reviews left by readers on sites such as Goodreads or Amazon, which "complained about excessive, 'pointless' sex scenes", and said that "[s]uch criticism is misplaced" due to their importance to understand the main character's "psychological and emotional trajectory."

Kirkus Reviews noted the pacing issue, saying "the novel sags with overwritten passages". Although the reviewer calls Rainbow Milk "compelling at times", they also mention the novel's "confused and inconsistent" structure. Annie Bostrom, reviewing for The Booklist, praised the novel and called it "an epic", saying Mendez shows skill when jumping between the past and the present in the story. The novel received a starred review from Publishers Weekly, which called it "an explosive Bildungsroman drawing on the legacy of Britain’s Windrush generation of 1950s migrants from the West Indies."
