= Constructing a Nervous System =

2022 memoir by Margo Jefferson

- Author: Margo Jefferson
- Publisher: Pantheon Books
- Publication date: 2022
- ISBN: 9781524748173

Constructing a Nervous System is a 2022 memoir by Margo Jefferson. It won the 2023 Rathbone Folio Prize.

The book was a finalist for the American Library Association's Carnegie Medal for Excellence in Non-Fiction in 2023. and the 2022 National Book Critics Circle Award for Criticism.
