= Margaret Caroline Rudd =

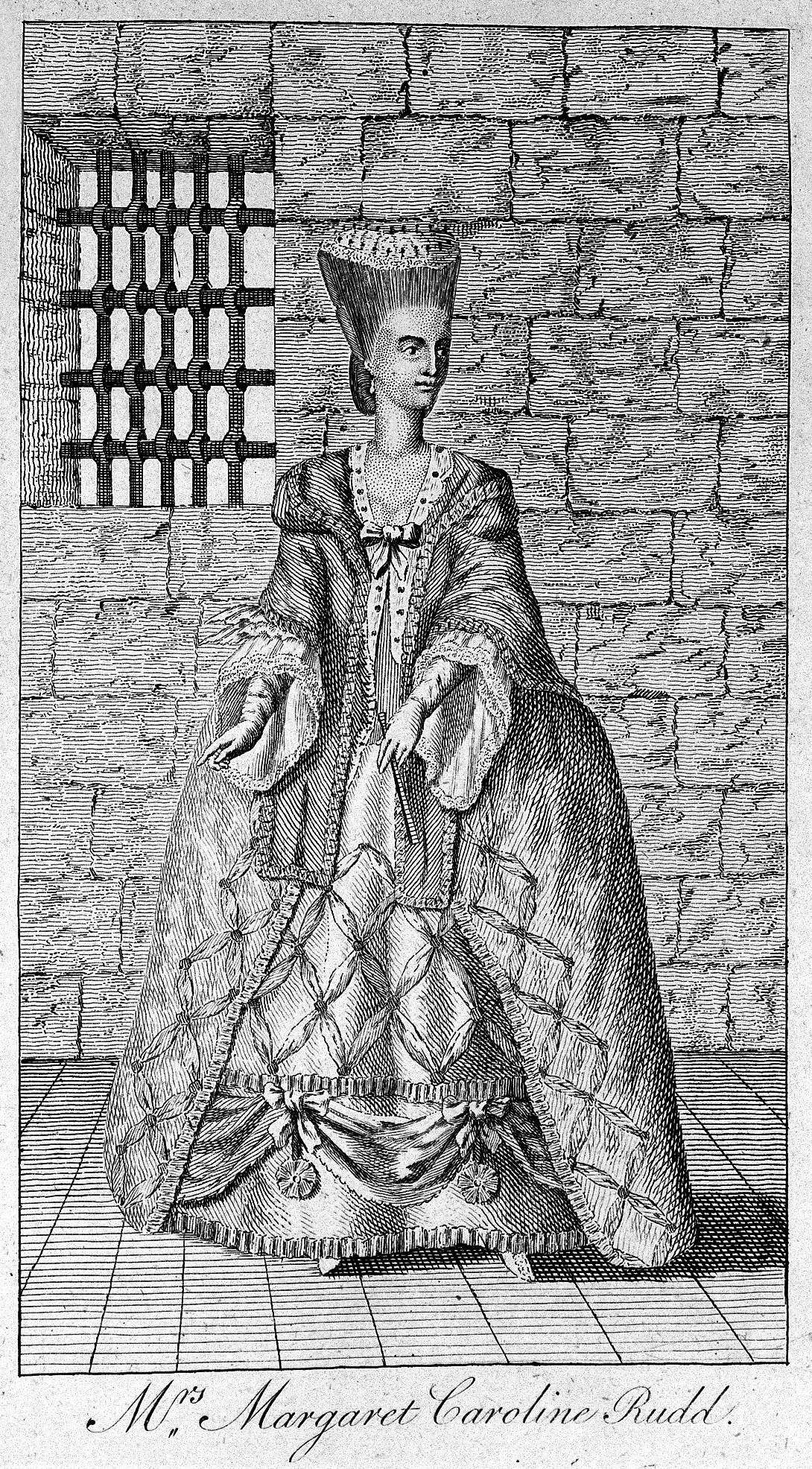
Margaret Caroline Rudd, 1776 engraving

Margaret Caroline Rudd (c. 1745 – c. 1798) was a female forger during the 18th century in Britain. She was accused of the offence in March 1775 along with the Perreau brothers, Daniel and Robert who claimed to have been framed by her. She got away with the crime, and the Perreaus were found guilty and executed.

== Life ==
She was born Margaret Caroline Youngson in 1745, in the town of Lurgan near Belfast, Northern Ireland. Her father, Patrick Youngson, was an apothecary of genteel appearance and education, and her mother, Isabella Stewart had a secret claim to nobility. Margaret was infatuated with the idea of belonging to nobility. She claimed Scottish ancestry when she was young, and even acquired a certificate to prove it. Margaret was an only child, and her parents both died when she was young. Her father died when she was a baby and her mother when she was eight. She was placed under the care of her uncle, John Stewart, who raised her to be an upstanding young woman. When she was old enough, he sent her to boarding school in Downpatrick. She created so much trouble, that she was expelled, and her uncle refused to have her back. She was sent to live with her grandmother, who couldn't control her wild behaviour. She yearned to leave her home town, and the chance presented itself when she met her future husband, Valentine Rudd.

== First marriage ==
Margaret was quite scandalous when it came to relationships. She was already getting involved with a number of young men at the age of fourteen, and her behaviour made her an outcast. Her first serious relationship was with a man named Valentine Rudd, a lieutenant who she got engaged to only ten days after he was stationed in her home town. After marrying, the two moved to London together, where Caroline had begun to spend and accumulate debt in her husband's name. Soon after, she ran off with another man, and continued to bill her purchases to Valentine Rudd. Her devious actions eventually drove him into financial ruin, and he was later put in debtors' prison. When he was released, he fled the country.

== Relationship with the Perreaus ==
Born July 1733, the Perreaus were identical twin brothers who differed in personality. Robert was an enterprising apothecary and businessman, and was happily married with children. Daniel was more of a gambler than a worker, and was also in great debt with little money. Daniel and Margaret met in April 1770. After becoming involved, Margaret had moved in with him, started calling herself Mrs. Perreau, and later had three children by him. Their relationship was serious, but they had never married; especially with her still being legally married to Valentine Rudd. During this time divorce was not a legal option, but an annulment could be granted by the court. Unfortunately it was a complicated process, and most couples chose to just separate and have affairs.

== Crime committed ==
Margaret was suspected of having forged a bond, which she allegedly persuaded Robert Perreau to deliver. This resulted in both Robert and Margaret being arrested on 11 March 1775, and detained at Newgate Prison until the case was further studied. Britain at the time had no police, so crimes were most often handled by the people. If one occurred, the information would be reported to a magistrate. The offence committed by Margaret was reported by Robert Perreau himself to local Magistrate William Addington. He claimed that he was victim of an elaborate scheme of forgery, and his story was supported by attorney Henry Dagge. He was asked by Mrs. Rudd to deliver a bond signed by wealthy army agent William Adair, and had later discovered it was a fraud. Margaret had admitted that she forged Adair's signature, when first addressed about the issue three days before, but when she learned that Robert was attempting to get her arrested she changed her story. She denied that the scheme was her idea, and that Daniel and Robert had forced her to sign the bond. Daniel was later arrested on suspension of a different forgery that was similar, while visiting his brother in prison. The case presented by Margaret and the Perreaus was too complicated to be easily handled.

== Court trials ==
Court trials were held at the Old Bailey court house, and each individual involved in the offence were to tell their part. The room was packed; consisting of the Judge, a twelve-man jury, team of defendants, large group of witnesses, and crowd. The first trial held was Robert Perreau's, on 1 June 1775. Banker Henry Drummond had received the forged bond from Robert. He was called to the stand to explain what he witnessed. According to him, Robert was a respectable man that the bank had dealings with for quite some time. On 15 January 1775, Robert came to him, requesting a loan of 1400 pounds, and had promised to repay it within ten days. Robert didn't return until 7 March, and when he did he requested another loan for 5000 pounds; some of which he planned to use towards the first loan. That is also when he produced a bond for 7500 pounds, which he claimed to be signed by William Adair. Drummond had found the bond's authenticity to be questionable, and Robert left and returned a few hours later with a letter he said was written permission from Adair that he could receive the bond. The banker asked for him to leave the bond overnight, and the next day proposed that they visit Adair to clear up the confusion. When they did, Adair said that he had never met Robert before nor did he remember signing the bond. Next to the stand was Daniel Perreau. He was convicted of a similar offence, forging a bond of 3100 pounds with the signature of William Adair. The trials of both brothers were lengthy in comparison to most. Daniels lasted for two hours while Roberts lasted for nine.

Margaret's trial was held on 8 December, and it attracted a large audience. She was tried as any other suspect and not as an accomplice because her stories didn't add up. Either way, she had an advantage over the Perreaus; her skilful lawyers and the fact that she was a woman. Her lawyers used the weaknesses of the prosecution witnesses to play in their favour, and Margaret aided in this. She briefed them in advance on everything she knew and passed notes to them throughout the day. Her gender made her vulnerable in the eyes of the court, and appear less capable of composing a scheme of trickery that fooled two men. Her story of being the victim was also deemed more plausible. The Perreaus didn't gain much sympathy for their story, not even from the ones who supported them. The idea that a mere woman had outsmarted them only put them in a dim light.

== Execution of the Perreaus ==
It was decided by the court that Margaret would go free, and the Perreaus executed by hanging. Even though the decision had been made, Margaret decided to take it upon herself to write Viscount Weymouth, the secretary of state responsible for constructing the final submission to the king proposing pardon. The letter she composed further incriminated the Perreaus; making them appear as money hungry gamblers with much debt on their hands. Weymouth considered his decision with all the evidence he had. Out of all the petitions he received, only Margaret's argued for the execution to be made final. His final decision was to pass no recommendation of mercy, and the Perreaus were still to be executed.

On 17 January, many had gathered to view the death of the wealthy Perreau brothers, including a large number of influential people, but not all could be admitted. They arrived to their execution in Newgate around 8 am dressed finely in black suits; presenting themselves as prideful men. The brothers didn't admit their guilt but continued to repeat the charges they had made during their trials. Robert pleaded his innocence by saying "his only mistake was believing everything Daniel and Margaret had told him". Daniel had done the same, saying that "his love for Margret had led him to place his entire trust in her." Before hanging, the two brothers kissed and joined hands; leaving the world at the same time just as they had arrived.

== Later life ==
The famous forgery flooded the daily newspapers for almost a year. The Perreau family was able to retain their influential connections in the financial world. The death of the twins didn't have as large of an effect on their status as it did their family. Margaret re-emerged as a failed essayist and novelist in the late 1780s. She later had another affair with writer James Boswell in 1786, who thought her to be a wonderful woman even after learning her story. Their relationship was passionate and short lived; having lasted for only several months. The first time they met was 22 April 1776. Boswell visited Margaret in attempt to interview her about her forgery case. After their first meeting, they met again nine years later and became involved, around the time she was forty years old.

== Bibliography ==
- Rudd, Margaret Caroline (1776). Authentic anecdotes of the life and transactions of Mrs. Margaret Rudd: Consisting of a Variety of Facts hitherto unknown to the Public. Addressed in a series of letters to the now (by a late act of Parliament) Miss Mary Lovell. In two volumes. Dublin: Printed for B. Corcoran, J. Potts, J. Hoey, W. Colles, W. Wilson, C. Jenkin, T. Walker, R. Moncrieffe, M. Mills, J. Exshaw, J. Beatty, and P. Wogan. OCLC 642146064.
- Andrew, Donna T.; McGowen, Randall (2001). The Perreaus and Mrs. Rudd Forgery and Betrayal in Eighteenth-century London. Berkeley: University of California Press. ISBN 0520923707. OCLC 70732870.
- Bakewell, Sarah (2001). Smart: the story of Margaret Caroline Rudd and the unfortunate Perreau brothers. London: Chatto & Windus. ISBN 9780701171094. OCLC 45827832.
- Ferraro, Joanne Marie (2001). Marriage Wars in Late Renaissance Venice. Oxford: Oxford University. ISBN 9780195180183. OCLC 232157136.
- Turnbull, Gordon (Summer 1986). "Criminal Biographer: Boswell and Margaret Caroline Rudd". SEL: Studies in English Literature 1500–1900. Vol. 26, no. 3. MLA International Bibliography, EBSCOhost. pp. 511–535. ISSN 0039-3657.
