= The Frenchmen, Or, My Life in Theory =

2026 Nonfiction book by Emily Eakin

The Frenchmen, or, My life in theory
- 2026 Book jacket
- Author: Emily Eakin
- Audio read by: Emily Eakin
- Language: English
- Subject: 20th century French philosophers
- Genre: Memoir and biographies
- Published in: New York City
- Publisher: Penguin Books
- Publication date: July 21, 2026
- Media type: Print, E-book and Audio
- Pages: 496
- ISBN: 9781594206320
- OCLC: 1596268368
- Website: Official website

The Frenchmen Or, My Life in Theory by Emily Eakin is a memoir about the author's youthful affection for French philosophical theorists and their ideas that dominated her campus life, while a student at Harvard University in the 1980s. The book is also a biographical account of these French theorists. This book was published on July 21, 2026 by Penguin Press.

== Synopsis ==
In this book, Eakin explains why she left her literature PhD program in 1994. She quit partly due to the dearth of academic jobs, but mostly because she was frustrated with an academic concept known as "theory." The definition of theory in this context refers to a 1960s French intellectual movement that significantly changed humanities departments in American universities and was the cause of early cultural debates. Eakin connects "theory" to the rise of structuralism, that caused two major shifts in humanities academy. It replaced existentialism, or the concept of free will and free choice of the individual, with the realization that people are heavily influenced by impersonal systems. This was followed by establishing language as the most influential system. For example, words have been haphazardly manufactured and only have meaning through their relationship with other words.

Eakin discusses the lives and theories of prominent, post- World War II French philosophers, theorists, and psychoanalysts associated with the movement, including Jacques Derrida, Michel Foucault, Gilles Deleuze, Jacques Lacan, Louis Althusser, Félix Guattari, Roland Barthes, and Paul de Man. By the mid-1970s, this French intellectual movement had been strongly imported from Europe. Its presence in American higher education was represented by persons with significant influence at major institutions like Yale University on the East Coast and UC Berkeley on the West Coast.

== Reception ==
Jonathan Derbyshire, reviewing this book for the Financial Times says, "... it is to Eakin’s credit that she doesn’t really go in for what Erdur calls “theory bashing”. Her book ends not with an obituary for a “god that failed” but with a provocation — that, for all its excesses and its broken political promises, theory’s legacy of “vigilant questioning, of scrupulous attentiveness to language’s complexities and contradictions” might not be as “antithetical to the common good” as many of its critics have charged.

A New York Times book reviewer, Clancy Martin says, "All of the stories you half remember about the French postmodernists are here told in careful, lively, playful detail. This is intellectual anthropology as it ought to be: cafe gossip with the footnotes left in. It makes you wish you could take a seminar from Eakin and makes you miss those glorious days in graduate school when you spent more time drinking beer and talking about philosophy than writing or even reading the stuff... That said, Eakin is more curious about the men than about their arguments, and that’s my other small complaint about the book

According to Jim Holt, author of Why Does the World Exist? — "Eakin delivers exactly what we want: a panoramic and intellectually wised-up chronicle of the High Theory with which France seduced America, plus all the High Drama behind it: rivalries, takedowns, political ructions, betrayals, drugs, madness, uxoricide, fraud (not all of it intellectual), and jouissance (not all of it sexual). It’s an opera of ideas, and an absurdly entertaining one.”
