= Crudo (novel) =

2018 novel by Olivia Laing

- First edition
- Author: Olivia Laing
- Language: English
- Publisher: Picador (UK); W. W. Norton & Company (US)
- Publication place: United Kingdom

Crudo is a 2018 novel by Olivia Laing. The book, Laing's first novel, incorporates autobiographical elements and details from the life of American author Kathy Acker. The novel was well-received, winning the James Tait Black Memorial Prize.

== Composition and writing ==
Laing originally did not intend to publish the book, saying they were "writing it for [theirself]". They have referred to the book as an "experiment", and in order to "[...] smash the mold of the kind of book [they] might be expected to produce". While writing the book, Laing followed two rules: that they had to write daily, and that they could not "[...] edit or reshape the material". They wrote the book "in a frenzy" over a period of six weeks. They included news events, mostly drawn from her Twitter feed, as they occurred during the days they was writing.

Laing's inspiration for the book came while they were vacationing in the Val d'Orcia region of Italy. During the trip Laing read a biography of Kathy Acker by Chris Kraus and was intrigued by Acker's deliberate plagiarism and appropriation of the works of other authors, such as Charles Dickens and Miguel de Cervantes. Laing had previously read some of Acker's work. Laing has referred to the novel's protagonist as a "[...] hybrid Frankenstein composite of me and Acker". The book includes references to Acker's works, such as Blood and Guts in High School.

== Reception ==
=== Critical reception ===
Sally Rooney wrote in The Guardian "I don't think I'll ever forget the day I spent reading Crudo." She described it as "a beautiful, strange, intelligent novel." Dwight Garner, in a review written for The New York Times, referred to the novel as "less persuasive" than Laing's non-fiction work. Garner noted that Crudo is Laing's first novel, and that it seemed she was "[...] still feeling her way" into fiction. In her review for The New Yorker, Alexandra Schwartz praised the book as a "funny, fervent" novel.

Dilara O'Neil, writing for The Nation, compared Crudo unfavorably to Ben Lerner's novel 10:04.

=== Honors ===
Laing won the James Tait Black Memorial Prize for the novel. A judge for the prize, Alex Lawrie, praised Crudo, saying it was "[...] a bold and reactive political novel that captures a raw slice of contemporary history with pace, charm, and wit".

Rather than retain the £10,000 award for herself, she chose to split it with the authors shortlisted for the prize. Laing has said that choosing a single winner for an artistic prize can be "corrosive...part of a capitalist model that has no place in art". She also reiterated a claim made in the novel that "[...] competition has no place in art". The authors with whom Laing shared the prize were Will Eaves, Jessie Greengrass, and Nafissa Thompson-Spires.

Crudo was featured as one of 2018's best novels in lists compiled by The New York Times and New Yorker.
