= The Lonely City =

2016 non-fiction book by Olivia Laing

The Lonely City: Adventures in the Art of Being Alone
- First edition (US)
- Author: Olivia Laing
- Language: English
- Genre: Non-fiction
- Publisher: Picador
- Publication date: 2016

The Lonely City: Adventures in the Art of Being Alone is a non-fiction book written by British writer Olivia Laing. It was first published in 2016 by Canongate in the UK and Picador in the US. Like Laing's previous works, The Lonely City blends research, biography and memoir.

The majority of the research for the book took place when Laing was living alone in New York City, United States, after having been abruptly left by a partner. Their reflections on the isolation they felt during this time make their way into the book.

== Contents ==
The book is divided into eight chapters, with each chapter beginning with Laing's experiences being alone in New York, before devolving into reflections on artists and the way in which loneliness permeated their work. Laing also discusses the artists' own experiences living in New York and how they depicted the city in their art.

In order, the artists discussed are:

- Edward Hopper (and his wife Josephine Hopper)
- Andy Warhol
- David Wojnarowicz (and Nan Goldin)
- Henry Darger
- Vivian Maier
- Klaus Nomi
- Josh Harris
- Zoe Leonard

== Reception ==
The book was well-received, earning generally positive reviews.
