= This Is Not Propaganda =

2019 book by Peter Pomerantsev

- First edition (UK)
- Author: Peter Pomerantsev
- Subject: Propaganda, Russian history
- Publisher: Faber & Faber (UK); PublicAffairs (US)
- Publication date: 2019
- Pages: 256
- ISBN: 9781541762138

This Is Not Propaganda: Adventures in the War Against Reality is a 2019 book by Peter Pomerantsev about disinformation and propaganda, which covers such campaigns in multiple countries.

Seve Bloomfield of The Guardian described the work as "Part memoir, part investigation, part cry for help".

The work discusses digital propaganda and how it affects viewer's senses of normality. He observed how the manipulation of reality characterizing Russian politics was used in the 2016 U.S. presidential election and in the Brexit referendum. The book includes a discussion on Rodrigo Duterte. The book also argues that destroying the idea of objective truth is a goal of various internet propaganda campaigns, as well as destroying the trust in democracy, and information overload meant to persuade people to put trust into dictatorial figures. The end of the book gives suggestions on how to build journalistic and online practices to solidify a focus on facts.

The book also describes activists who are attempting to counter the new propaganda techniques and restore faith in democracy.

In observing the book, reviewer Scott McLemee argued that the proliferation of this style of propaganda is a form of globalization.

== Background ==
Pomerantsev observed that propaganda practices in Russia began to be used in the west, spurring him to write this book. According to Pomerantsev, the belief that access to information would increase knowledge of the truth was hindered by the new propaganda techniques.
