= California Book Awards =

Literary award for Californian authors

The California Book Awards are annual literary awards given to California writers and publishers since 1931. The event is sponsored by the Commonwealth Club of California. The California Book Awards are funded by an endowment from Dr. Martha Heasley Cox, late professor of American Literature at San Jose State University. Medals (gold and silver) and cash prizes are currently awarded in the categories of Fiction, Nonfiction, Poetry, First Work of Fiction, Californiana (nonfiction relating to California), Juvenile Literature (up to age 10), Young Adult Literature (age 11–16), and Notable Contribution to Publishing. More than 400 books are submitted per year. The winning books are selected by an independent jury.

== Winners ==
=== Californiana ===
California Book Award for Californiana winners
Year	Title	Author	Result	Ref.
1955	The Big Oak Flat Road	Irene D. Paden	Silver	
1956	Men of the Western Waters: A Second Look at the First Americans	Dale Van Every	Silver	
1957	San Francisco Bay	Harold Gilliam	Silver	
1958	Montgomery and the Portsmouth	Fred B. Rogers	Silver	
1959	The Earth Shook, the Sky Burned : A Photographic Record of the 1906 San Francisco Earthquake and Fire	William Bronson	Silver	
1961	Ishi in Two Worlds: A Biography of the Last Wild Indian in North America	Theodora Kroeber	Silver	
1962	Journey into Darkness: Cabeza de Vaca's Expedition Across North America, 1528-36	John Upton Terrel	Silver	
1963	South From San Francisco - San Mateo County, CA	Frank Stanger	Silver	
1964	Sarah and the Senator	Robert Kroninger	Silver	
1966	Chancy and the Grand Rascal	Sid Flesischmen	Silver	
1967	Fool's Gold: The Decline and Fall of Captain John Sutter of California	Richard Dillon	Silver	
1968	Everyman's Eden	Ralph Roske	Silver	
1969	The Great Betrayal	Audrie Girdner	Silver	
1970	The El Dorado Trail	Ferol Egan	Silver	
1971	The Indispensable Enemy	Alexander Saxton	Silver	
1972	Monterey: The Presence of the Past	Augusta Fink	Silver	
1973	Chile, Peru & the California Gold Rush of 1849	Jay Monaghan	Silver	
1974	An Everyday History of Somewhere	Ray Raphael	Gold	
1975	Nothing Seemed Impossible	David Lavender	Gold	
1978	The Dark Range	David R. Wallace	Silver	
1981	World Rushed in: The California Gold Rush	J. S. Holliday	Gold	
1982	Winemaking in California	Ruth Teiser	Gold	
1983	Klamath Knot	David R. Wallace	Silver	
1984	The University of California / Southeby Book of California Wine	Doris Muscatine	Gold	
1985	Art in San Francisco Bay Area, 1945-1980	Thomas Albright	Gold	
1986	The Golden Gate: A Novel in Verse	Vikram Sethi	Gold	
1987	Bitter Melon: Stories from the Last Rural Chinese Town in America (Locke, California)	Jeff Gillenkirk	Gold	
1988	Julia Morgan, Architect	Sara Boutelle	Gold	
1989	Denial of Disaster: The Untold Story and Photographs of the San Francisco Earthquake and Fire of 1906	Gladys S. Hansen	Gold	
1990	Bay Area Figurative Art 1950-65	Caroline A. Jones	Gold	
1991	Farming on the Edge: Saving Family Farms in Marin County, California	John Hart	Gold	
1991	Tradition and Innovation: A Basket History of the Indians of the Yosemite-Mono Lake Area	Yosemite Association	Silver	
1992	Josiah Royce: From Grass Valley to Harvard	Robert V. Hine	Gold	
1993	The Great Central Valley	Robert Dawson, Gerald Haslam, and Stephen Johnson	Silver	
1994	The Unseen Peninsula	Robert Buelteman and Robert McDonald	Gold	
1996	Storm Over Mono	John Hart	Gold	
1997	The Dream Endures: California Enters the 1940s	Kevin Starr	Silver	
1998	Harvest Son: Planting Roots in American Soil	David Mas Masumoto	Silver	
1999	Rush for Riches: Gold Fever and the Making of California	J. S. Holliday	Silver	
2000	The Literature of California Volume 1: Native American Beginnings to 1945	Jack Hicks	Silver	
2001	Capturing Light: Masterpieces of California Photography, 1850-2000	Drew Heath Johnson	Silver	
2002	Writing Los Angeles: A Literary Anthology	David Ulin	Silver	
2003	The King of California	Rick Wartzman and Mark Arax	Silver	
2004	Beasts of Field: California Migrant Farm Workers 1865-1913	Richard Steven Street	Silver	
2005	The Great Earthquake and Firestorms of 1906: How San Francisco Nearly Destroyed Itself	Philip Fradkin	Silver	
2006	The Great Black Way	R. J. Smith	Silver	
2007	Reinventing Los Angeles	Robert Gottlieb	Silver	
2008	The Los Angeles Plaza: Sacred and Contested Space	William David Estrada	Gold	
2009	Wherever There's A Fight	Elaine Ellinson and Stan Yogi	Gold	
2010	A State of Change: Forgotten Landscapes of California	Laura Cunningham	Gold	
2011	Chuckwalla Land: The Riddle of California's Desert	David Rains Wallace	Gold	
2012	Sunshine Was Never Enough	John Laslett	Gold	
2013	Chief: The Quest for Justice in California	Ronald M. George	Gold	
2014	San Francisco's Jewel City	Laura A. Ackley	Gold	
2015	California's Wild Edge	Tom Killion	Gold	
2016	An American Genocide	Benjamin Madley	Gold	
2017	The Modoc War	Robert Aquinas McNally	Gold	
2018	The Browns of California	Miriam Pawel	Gold	
2019	The Dreamt Land	Mark Arax	Gold	
2021	California Exposures	Richard and Jesse White	Gold	
2022	Everything Now	Rosecrans Baldwin	Gold	
2023	The High Sierra	Kim Stanley Robinson	Gold	
2024	California Against the Sea: Visions for Our Vanishing Coastline	Rosanna Xia	Gold	
2025	A Machine to Move Ocean and Earth	James Tejani	Gold	

=== Contribution to Publishing ===
California Book Award for Contribution to Publishing winners
Year	Title	Recipient	Result	Ref.
1971	Textile Art in the Church	Marion Ireland	Silver	
1983	Mountains of the Middle Kingdom: Exploring the High Peaks of China and Tibet	Galen Rowell	Silver	
1984	The Hill Towns of Italy	Carole Field	Silver	
1984	Celebrating Italy	Carole Field	Silver	
1985	John O'shea, 1876-1956	Walter Nelson-Rees	Silver	
1986	Mountain Light: In Search of the Dynamic Landscape	Galen Rowell	Silver	
1987	Dryland: Desert of North America	Phillip Hyde	Silver	
1990	O California	Steven Vincent	Silver	
1992	Napoleon	Proctor Jones	Silver	
1993	The Arts and Crafts Movement in California: Living the Good Life	Kenneth Trapp	Silver	
1994	Two Eagles/Dos Aguiles	Tupper Blake and Peter Steinhart	Silver	
1997	Snakes: The Evolution of Mystery in Nature	Harry W. Greene	Silver	
2000	California Calls You	KD and Gary Kurutz	Silver	
2001	Splendide Californie! Selections by French Artists of California History 1786-1900	Claudine Chalmers, Book Club of California	Silver	
2002	High Sierra of California	Gary Snyder	Silver	
2003	Rising Up and Rising Down	William Vollmann	Silver	
2006	Children's Book Press	Children's Book Press	Silver	
2007	Impressions of the East	Deborah Rudolph	Silver	
2008	Asian American Art: A History, 1850-1970	Stanford University Press	Gold	
2009	The Zohar Pritzker Edition, Volume Five	Stanford University Press	Gold	
2010	Autobiography of Mark Twain Volume 1	University of California Press Berkeley and Los Angeles	Gold	
2011	Ten Years that Shook the City: San Francisco 1968-1978	City Lights Publishers	Gold	
2012	Valley of Shadows and Dreams	Ken and Melanie Light	Gold	
2013	Scrape the Willow Until it Sings	Debora Valoma	Gold	
2014	The Heyday of Malcolm Margolin	Kim Bancroft	Gold	
2015	Collected Letters of Robinson Jeffers	James Karman, Stanford University Press	Gold	
2016	Ecosystems of California	Mooney and Zavalet, Yale University Press	Gold	
2017	The California Field Atlas	Obi Kaufmann	Gold	
2018	Carleton Watkins	Tyler Green	Gold	
2019	Jim Marshall: Show Me the Picture	Amelia Davis	Gold	
2021	A Natural History of the Anza-Borrego Region	Marie Simovich	Gold	
2022	A Rebel's Outcry	Jeffrey Gee Chin	Gold	
2023	The Klamath Mountains	Michael Kauffmann	Gold	
2024	KAOS Theory: The Afrokosmic Ark of Ben Caldwell	Robeson Taj Frazier	Gold	
2025	Terminal Island: Lost Communities on America's Edge	Geraldine Knatz and Naomi Hirahara, Angel City Press	Gold	

=== First Fiction / First Work ===
The California Book Award for First Fiction was first presented in 1977. In 1995, it was presented as the California Book Award for First Work.

California Book Award for First Fiction winners
Year	Title	Author	Result	Ref.
1977	The Wanderers	Ingrid Rimland	Gold	
1978	A Woman of Independent Means	Elizabeth F. Halley	Silver	
1979	Years of the French	Thomas Flanagan	Gold	
1982	Story for a Black Night	Clayton Bess	Silver	
1983	A Dime to Dance By	Walter Walker	Silver	
1984	Tapping the Source	Kem Nunn	Silver	
1986	Small Business: A Novel	Tom Parker	Silver	
1987	Imagining Argentina	Lawrence Thornton	Silver	
1987	Unremembered Country Poems	Susan Griffin	Silver	
1992	Cantora	Sylvia Lopez-Medina	Silver	
1993	Tuscaloosa	W. Glasgow Philips	Silver	
1995	Jackson Street and other Soldier Stories	John Miller	Gold	
1995	Reckless Driver	Lisa Vice	Silver	
1996	Sacred Dust	David Hill	Silver	
1997	Circumnavigation	Steve Lattimore	Silver	
1998	Hunger	Samantha Chang	Silver	
1999	Oxygen Man	Steve Yarbrough	Gold	
1999	The Artist of the Missing	Paul La Farge	Silver	
1999	Crooked	Laura and Tom McNeal	Silver	
2000	The Ice Harvest	Scott Phillips	Silver	
2000	Rope Burns: Stories from the Corner	F. X. Toole	Silver	
2001	Edgewater Angels	Sandro Meallot	Silver	
2002	The Last Good Chance	Tom Barbash	Silver	
2002	The Lovely Bones	Alice Sebold	Silver	
2003	Drinking Coffee Elsewhere	ZZ Packer	Silver	
2004	Every Night is Ladies' Night	Michael Jamie-Becerra	Silver	
2005	A Thousand Years of Good Prayer	Yiyun Li	Silver	
2006	Artificial Light	James Greer	Silver	
2007	Sons and Other Flammable Objects	Porochista Khakpour	Silver	
2008	Telex From Cuba	Rachel Kushner	Gold	
2008	The Legend of a Suicide	David Vann	Silver	
2009	The Bigness of the World	Lori Ostlund	Gold	
2010	The Lost Books of the Odyssey	Zachary Mason	Gold	
2011	Turn of Mind	Alice LaPlante	Gold	
2012	A Partial History of Lost Causes	Jennifer DuBois	Gold	
2012	Masha'allah and Other Stories	Mariah K. Young	Silver	
2013	A Constellation of Vital Phenomena	Anthony Marra	Gold	
2014	Waiting for the Electricity	Christina Nichol	Gold	
2014	The Un-Americans	Molly Antopol	Silver	
2015	The Sympathizer	Viet Thanh Nguyen	Gold	
2016	Dog Years	Melissa Yancy	Gold	
2017	Goodbye, Vitamin	Rachel Khong	Gold	
2018	There There	Tommy Orange	Gold	
2018	Fruit of the Drunken Tree	Ingrid Rojas Contreras	Silver	
2019	Home Remedies	Xuan Wang	Gold	
2019	Last of Her Name	Mimi Lok	Silver	
2021	How Much of These is God	C Pam Zhang	Gold	
2022	Skinship	Yoon Choi	Gold	
2022	City of a Thousand Gates	Rebecca Sacks	Silver	
2023	Nightcrawling	Leila Mottley	Gold	
2023	The Red Arrow	William Brewer	Silver	
2024	All-Night Pharmacy	Ruth Madievsky	Gold	
2025	Your Presence is Mandatory	Sasha Vasilyuk	Gold	

=== Fiction ===
California Book Award for Fiction winners
Year	Title	Author	Result	Ref.
1941	When the Living Strive	Richard LaPiere	Silver	
1942	The Stranger in Big Sur	Lillian Bos Ross	Silver	
1942	The Man Who Killed the Deer	Frank Waters	Silver	
1943	Wide is the Gate	Upton Sinclair	Silver	
1944	Captain Retread	Donald Hough	Silver	
1945	High Bonnet	Idwal Jones	Silver	
1946	The Big Tree	Mary and Conrad Buff	Gold	
1947	Blood Brother	Elliot Arnold	Gold	
1948	Sky and Forest	C. S. Forester	Gold	
1948	The Nine Brides and Granny Hite	Neill C. Wilson	Silver	
1949	The Journey of Simon Mckeever	Albert Maltz	Gold	
1949	The Revolt in San Marcos	Robert C. North	Silver	
1949	Epicurus, My Master	Max Radin	Silver	
1950	Bridal Journey	Dale Van Every	Gold	
1950	About Mrs. Leslie	Viña Delmar	Silver	
1951	Sandra and the Right Prince	Mildred Napier Anderson	Gold	
1951	No Vacancy	Mary Jane Rolfs	Silver	
1951	Tracy's Tiger	William Saroyan	Silver	
1952	Time’s Traveler	Stanton Coblentz	Silver	
1952	Wapiti the Elp	Neill C. Wilson	Silver	
1952	Winds of Mourning	H. L. Davis	Gold	
1953	The High and the Mighty	Ernest Gann	Gold	
1953	Fahrenheit 451	Ray Bradbury	Silver	
1954	The Nightmare	C. S. Forester	Gold	
1954	Beyond the Hungry Country	Louise Stinetorf	Silver	
1954	Epics of Everest	Leonard Wibberley	Silver	
1955	The Genius and the Goddess	Aldous Huxley	Silver	
1955	The Good Shepherd	C. S. Forester	Silver	
1956	The Long Watch	Elizabeth Linington	Silver	
1956	Spook the Mustang	Harlan Thompson	Silver	
1957	The Wilderness Brigade	Phyllis Demarest	Gold	
1957	The Braintree Mission	Nicholas Wyckoff	Silver	
1957	The Flower Drum Song	C. Y. Lee	Silver	
1957	Knock and Wait a While	William Weeks	Silver	
1958	Warlock	Oakley Hall	Gold	
1958	The Sergeant	Dennis R. Murphys	Silver	
1959	Flight from Ashiya	Elliot Arnold	Gold	
1959	The Thirteenth Apostle	Eugene Vale	Silver	
1960	The Infidels	Chloe Gartner	Silver	
1960	A Shooting Star	Wallace Stegner	Silver	
1961	Mila 18	Leon Uris	Gold	
1961	The Agony and the Ecstasy	Irving Stone	Silver	
1962	The Everlasting Fire	Jon Reed Lauritzen	Silver	
1962	Heart of the Wild: Animal Stories of the California Redwood Coast	Chet Schwarzkopf	Silver	
1963	The House That Tai Ming Built	Virginia Lee	Silver	
1964	The Man	Irving Wallace	Silver	
1964	Armageddon	Leon Uris	Silver	
1964	Gathering of Zion	Wallace Stegner	Silver	
1965	The Year of the Death	Reuben Merliss	Silver	
1966	The Crow Flies Crooked	Jack Kisling	Silver	
1966	All the Little Heroes	Herbert Wilner	Silver	
1967	A Night of Watching	Elliott Arnold	Gold	
1967	All the Little Live Things	Wallace Stegner	Silver	
1968	Airport	Arthur Hailey	Silver	
1970	Crimson Ramblers of the World, Farewell	Jessamyn West	Silver	
1971	The Exorcist	William Peter Blatty	Gold	
1973	The Cowboy and the Crossack	Clair Huffaker	Silver	
1973	Yours and Mine	Judith Rascoe	Silver	
1974	The Connoisseur	Evan Connell, Jr.	Silver	
1974	A Time for Titans	Viña Delmar	Silver	
1974	Against the Law	Leonard Levy	Silver	
1974	Love Out of Season	Ella Leffland	Silver	
1975	The Great Train Robbery	Michael Crichton	Silver	
1976	A New Age Now Begins	Page Smith	Silver	
1976	The Spectator Bird	Wallace Stegner	Silver	
1976	Small Moments	Nancy H. Packer	Silver	
1977	Haywire	Brooke Hayward	Silver	
1980	Impossible Appetites: Nine Stories	James Fetler	Silver	
1981	Family: Novel in Form of a Memoir	Herbert Gold	Silver	
1982	Infinite Passion of Expectation: 25 Stories	Gina Berriault	Silver	
1983	A Gathering of Old Men	Ernest Gaines	Silver	
1984	Stones for Ibarra	Harriet Doerr	Silver	
1985	Face	Cecile Pineda	Silver	
1985	Greasy Lake & Other Stories	T. Coraghessan Boyle	Silver	
1985	Reasons to Live	Amy Hempel	Silver	
1986	Birds Landing	Ernest Finney	Silver	
1987	World's End	T. Coraghessan Boyle	Silver	
1989	The Joy Luck Club	Amy Tan	Silver	
1990	Even Now	Michelle Latiolais	Silver	
1990	Limbo River	Rick Hillis	Silver	
1991	Mariette in Ecstasy	Ron Hansen	Silver	
1991	Sarah Canary	Karen Fowler	Silver	
1992	When Nietzsche Wept	Irvin Yalom	Gold	
1992	Red Square	Martin Cruz Smith	Silver	
1994	The Palace Thief	Ethan Canin	Silver	
1994	The Zoo Where You're Fed to God	Michael Ventura	Silver	
1995	Naming the Spirits	Lawrence Thornton	Silver	
1996	Women in Their Beds	Gina Berriault	Gold	
1996	Flights in the Heavenlies	Ernest J. Finney	Silver	
1997	Le Divorce	Diane Johnson	Gold	
1997	Creek Walk and Other Stories	Miles Giles	Silver	
1998	Goodnight, Nebraska	Tom McNeal	Silver	
1998	Lost Lake	Mark Slouka	Silver	
1999	Leaving Pico	Frank Gaspar	Silver	
2000	The Amazing Adventures of Kavalier and Clay	Michael Chabon	Gold	
2000	The Royal Family	William T. Vollmann	Silver	
2001	Highwire Moon	Susan Straight	Gold	
2001	Haussman, or The Distinction	Paul La Farge	Silver	
2002	The Miracle	John L'Heureux	Gold	
2003	Evidence of Things Unseen	Marianne Wiggins	Gold	
2003	Old School	Tobias Wolff	Silver	
2003	Parasites Like Us	Adam Johnson	Silver	
2004	The Confessions of Max Tivoli	Andrew Sean Greer	Gold	
2004	Graceland	Chris Abani	Silver	
2004	Happy Baby	Stephen Elliott	Silver	
2005	Europe Central	William T. Vollmann	Gold	
2005	Nice Big American Baby	Judy Budnitz	Silver	
2005	Snow Flower and the Secret Fan	Lisa See	Silver	
2006	Wizard of the Crow	Ngũgĩ wa Thiong'o	Gold	
2006	Talk, Talk	T. C. Boyle	Silver	
2007	The Yiddish Policeman's Union	Michael Chabon	Gold	
2007	A Thousand Splendid Suns	Khaled Hosseini	Silver	
2008	The End of the Jews	Adam Mansbach	Gold	
2009	The Vagrants	Yiyun Li	Gold	
2009	Both Ways is the Only Way I Want it	Maile Meloy	Silver	
2010	I Hotel	Karen Tei Yamashita	Gold	
2010	Model Home	Eric Puchner	Silver	
2011	The Barbarian Nurseries	Héctor Tobar	Gold	
2011	Love and Shame and Love	Peter Orner	Gold	
2012	The Orphan Master's Son	Adam Johnson	Gold	
2013	We Are All Completely Beside Ourselves	Karen Fowler	Gold	
2014	An Unnecessary Woman	Rabih Alameddine	Gold	
2014	Orfeo	Richard Powers	Silver	
2015	A Manual for Cleaning Women	Lucia Berlin	Gold	
2015	Elevation: 6,040	Ernest J. Finney	Silver	
2016	Moonglow	Michael Chabon	Gold	
2016	The Portable Veblen	Elizabeth McKenzie	Silver	
2017	The Age of Perpetual Light	Josh Weil	Gold	
2017	So Much Blue	Percival Everett	Silver	
2018	The Mars Room	Rachel Kushner	Gold	
2018	Winter Kept Us Warm	Anne Raeff	Silver	
2019	Your House Will Pay	Steph Cha	Gold	
2021	A Registry of My Passage Upon the Earth	Daniel Mason	Gold	
2021	Interior Chinatown	Charles Yu	Silver	
2022	The Archer	Shruti Swamy	Gold	
2022	The Committed	Viet Thanh Nguyen	Silver	
2023	Heartbroke	Chelsea Bieker	Gold	
2024	Blackouts	Justin Torres	Gold	
2025	James	Percival Everett	Gold	
2025	Creation Lake	Rachel Kushner	Silver	

=== General Literature ===
California Book Award for General Literature
Year	Title	Author	Result	Ref.
1932	Barabbas	Sara Bard Field	Silver	
1932	Nur Mahal	Harold Lamb	Silver	
1934	Lord’s Anointed	Ruth Mckee	Silver	
1935	Laughter Out of the Ground	Robin Lampson	Silver	
1936	In Dubious Battle	John Steinbeck	Silver	
1937	The Education of Hyman Kaplan	Leo Rosten	Silver	
1937	Pity the Tyrant	Hans Storm	Silver	
1938	East of the Giants	George Stewart	Silver	
1939	The Grapes of Wrath	John Steinbeck	Silver	
1939	The Time of Your Life	William Saroyan	Silver	
1939	Bright Heritage	Mary Provines	Silver	
1939	Death Loses a Pair of Wings: the Epic of William Gorgas and the Conquest of Yellow Fever	Robin Lampson	Silver	
1940	Wild Geese Calling	Stewart E. White	Silver	
1941	Anybody’s Gold: The Story of California Mining Towns	Joseph Henry Jackson	Silver	
1942	I Remember Christine	Oscar Lewis	Silver	
1943	Trio	Dorothy Baker	Silver	
1944	One Day at Beetle Rock	Sally Carrighar	Silver	
1945	A Lion in the Streets	Adria Locke	Silver	
1946	Western World: A Study of the Forces Shaping our Time	Royce Brier	Silver	
1947	The Trial of Soren Qvisr	Janet Lewis	Silver	
1948	Woman with a Sword: A Novel based on the Life of Ana Elle Carroll	Hollister Noble	Silver	

=== Juvenile and Young Adult ===
California Book Award for Juvenile and Young Adult winners
Year	Category	Title	Author	Result	Ref.
1940	Juvenile	Blue Willow	Doris Gates	Silver	
1942	Juvenile	Long Adventure	Hildegard Hawthorne	Silver	
1943	Juvenile	Spurs for Antonia	Katherine Eyre	Silver	
1944	Juvenile	Mystery at Thunderbolt House	Howard Pease	Silver	
1945	Juvenile	The Singing Cave	Margaret Leighton	Silver	
1946	Juvenile	Towards Oregon	E. H. Staffelbach	Silver	
1947	Juvenile	Sancho of the Long, Long Horns	Allan Bosworth	Silver	
1948	Juvenile	Seabird	Holling C. Holling	Silver	
1949	Juvenile	At the Palace Gates	Helen Parrish	Silver	
1950	Juvenile	Tomas and the Red Headed Angel	Marion Garthwaite	Silver	
1953	Juvenile	Roaring River	Bill Brown	Silver	
1955	Juvenile	Westward the Eagle	Frederick Lane	Silver	
1957	Juvenile	David and the Phoenix	Edward Ormondroyd	Silver	
1958	Juvenile	First Scientist of Alaska: William Healey Dall	Edward A. Herron	Silver	
1959	Juvenile	This is the Desert: The Story of America's Arid Religion	Phillip Ault	Silver	
1960	Juvenile	Hawaii the Aloha State	Helen Bauer	Silver	
1961	Juvenile	The Gray Sea Raiders	Gordon Shirreffs	Silver	
1962	Juvenile	First Woman Ambulance Surgeon: Emily Barringer	Iris Noble	Silver	
1963	Juvenile	The Keys and the Candle	Maryhale Woolsey	Silver	
1964	Juvenile	A Spell is Cast	Eleanor Cameron	Silver	
1965	Juvenile	Campion Towers	John Beatty	Silver	
1967	Juvenile	Silent Ship, Silent Sea	Robb White	Silver	
1968	Juvenile	Quest for Freedom	Paul Rink	Silver	
1969	Juvenile	The Cay	Theodore Taylor	Silver	
1969	Juvenile	The Green and Burning Tree	Eleanor Cameron	Silver	
1970	Juvenile	Jonah and the Great Fish	Clyde Bulla	Silver	
1971	Juvenile	Annie and the Old One	Miska Miles	Silver	
1972	Juvenile	Samurai of Gold Hill	Yoshiko Uchida	Silver	
1974	Juvenile	The Paper Party	Don Freemand	Silver	
1975	Juvenile	Coyotes: Last Animals On Earth	Harold E. Thomas	Silver	
1977	Juvenile	Shepherd Watches. Shepherd Sings	Louis Irigaray	Silver	
1978	Juvenile	North of Danger	Dale Fife	Silver	
1979	Juvenile	Fool and the Dancing Bear	Pamela Stearns	Silver	
1980	Juvenile	Fight of the Sparrow	Julia Cunningham	Gold	
1980	Juvenile	The Half-A-Moon Inn	Paul Fleischman	Silver	
1981	Juvenile	A Jar of Dreams	Yoshiko Uchida	Silver	
1983	Juvenile	Cry of the Kalahari	Delia Owens	Silver	
1983	Juvenile	Dear Mr. Henshaw	Beverly Cleary	Silver	
1984	Juvenile	Monkey Puzzle and Other Poems	Myra C. Livingston	Silver	
1985	Juvenile	The Willow Maiden	Meghan Collins	Silver	
1986	Juvenile	The Secret of the Mountain	Esther Linfield	Silver	
1987	Juvenile	Nell's Quilt	Susan Terris	Silver	
1988	Juvenile	Step into the Night	Joan Ryder	Silver	
1990	Juvenile	The Fabulous Fifty	Morton Grosser	Silver	
1990	Juvenile	Babushka's Doll	Patricia Polacco	Silver	
1991	Juvenile	Fly Away Home	Eve Bunting	Silver	
1991	Juvenile	Jayhawker	Patricia Beatty	Silver	
1992	Juvenile	A Bowl of Mischief	Kristiana Gregory	Silver	
1992	Juvenile	Chicken Sunday	Patricia Polacco	Silver	
1992	Juvenile	Earthquake at Dawn	Kristiana Gregory	Silver	
1993	Juvenile	Bull Run	Paul Fleischman	Silver	
1993	Juvenile	Dragon's Gate	Laurence Yep	Silver	
1993	Juvenile	Grandfather's Journey	Allen Say	Silver	
1994	Juvenile	Catherine, Called Birdy	Karen Cushman	Silver	
1994	Juvenile	Smoky Night	Eve Bunting	Silver	
1995	Juvenile	The Faithful Friend	Robert San Souci	Silver	
1995	Juvenile	A Time for Dancing	Davida Hurwin	Silver	
1995	Juvenile	Canto Familiar	Gary Soto	Silver	
1996	Juvenile	A Girl Named Disaster	Nancy Farmer	Silver	
1996	Juvenile	Minty: A Story of Young Harriet Tubman	Alan Schroeder	Silver	
1997	Juvenile	The Hired Hand: An African-American Folktale	Robert San Souci	Silver	
1998	Juvenile	I Rode a Horse of Milk White Jade	Diane Lee Wilson	Silver	
1998	Juvenile	Sitting Ducks	Michael Bedeard	Silver	
1999	Young Adult	Little Bo	Julie Andrews Edward	Silver	
2000	Juvenile	Jubal's Wish	Don and Audrey Wood	Silver	
2000	Young Adult	At the Sign of the Star	Katharine Sturtevant	Silver	
2001	Young Adult	Notes from a Liar & Her Dog	Gennifer Choldenko	Silver	
2002	Juvenile	When Marian Sang: The True Recital of Marion Anderson	Brian Selznick and Pam Munoz	Silver	
2002	Young Adult	This Land was Made for You and Me: Woody Guthrie	Elizabeth Patridge	Silver	
2003	Juvenile	Just a Minute: A Trickster Tale and Counting Book	Yuyi Morales	Silver	
2003	Young Adult	The City of Ember	Jeanne DuPrau	Silver	
2004	Juvenile	Walt Whitman: Words for America	Barbara Kerley	Silver	
2004	Young Adult	Worth	A. LaFaye	Silver	
2005	Juvenile	Terrific	John Agee	Silver	
2005	Young Adult	Cloud Chamber	Joyce Maynard	Silver	
2006	Juvenile	Landed	Milly Lee	Silver	
2006	Young Adult	A True and Faithful Narrative	Katherine Sturtevant	Silver	
2007	Young Adult	Revolution is Not a Dinner Party	Ying Chang Compestine	Silver	
2007	Young Adult	Thirteen Reasons Why	Jay Asher	Silver	
2008	Juvenile	We Are the Ship: The Story of Negro League Baseball	Kadir Nelson	Gold	
2008	Young Adult	White Sands, Red Menace	Ellen Klages	Gold	
2009	Juvenile	Lucky Breaks	Susan Patron	Gold	
2009	Young Adult	Flygirl	Sherri Smith	Gold	
2010	Juvenile	Grandma's Gloves	Cecil Castellucci	Gold	
2010	Young Adult	The Things a Brother Knows	Dana Reinhardt	Gold	
2011	Juvenile	One Day and One Amazing Morning on Orange Street	Jonanne Rocklin	Gold	
2011	Young Adult	The Apothecary	Maile Meloy	Gold	
2012	Juvenile	The One and Only Ivan	Katherine Applegate	Gold	
2012	Young Adult	Second Chance Summer	Morgan Matson	Gold	
2012	Young Adult	A Soldier's Secret: The Incredible True Story of Sarah Edmonds, A Civil War Hero	Marissa Moss	Silver	
2013	Juvenile	Barbed Wire Baseball	Marissa Moss	Gold	
2013	Young Adult	Far Far Away	Tom McNeal	Gold	
2014	Juvenile	The Fourteenth Goldfish	Jennifer L. Holm	Gold	
2014	Young Adult	Gabi, A Girl in Pieces	Isabel Quintero	Gold	
2015	Juvenile	Melissa	Alex Gino	Gold	
2015	Young Adult	Challenger Deep	Neal Shusterman	Gold	
2015	Young Adult	The Alex Crow	Andrew Smith	Silver	
2016	Juvenile	Cloud and Wallfish	Anne Nesbet	Gold	
2016	Young Adult	The Sun Is Also a Star	Nicola Yoon	Gold	
2017	Juvenile	Maya Lin: Thinking With Her Hands	Susan Goldman Rubin	Gold	
2017	Young Adult	The 57 Bus	Dashka Slater	Gold	
2018	Juvenile	The Language of Spells	Garret Weyr	Gold	
2018	Young Adult	Picture Us In The Light	Kelly Loy Gilbert	Gold	
2019	Juvenile	A Place to Belong	Cynthia Kadohata	Gold	
2019	Young Adult	Frankly in Love	David Yoon	Gold	
2021	Juvenile	Efrén Divided	Ernesto Cisneros	Gold	
2021	Young Adult	Private Lessons	Cynthia Salaysay	Gold	
2021	Young Adult	The Black Kids	Christina Hammonds Reed	Silver	
2022	Juvenile	Wishes	Muron Thi Van	Gold	
2022	Young Adult	Home is Not a Country	Safia Elhillo	Gold	
2023	Juvenile	Seen and Unseen	Elizabeth Partridge	Gold	
2023	Young Adult	Ophelia After All	Racquel Marie	Gold	
2024	Juvenile	The Honey Jar: An Armenian's Escape to Freedom	Joan Schoettler	Gold	
2024	Young Adult	Accountable: The True Story of a Racist Social Media Account and the Teenagers Whose Lives It Changed	Dashka Slater	Gold	
2024	Young Adult	The Blood Years	Elana K. Arnold	Silver	
2025	Juvenile	A Map for Falasteen: A Palestinian Child's Search for Home	Maysa Odeh and Aliaa Betawi	Gold	
2025	Young Adult	Everything We Never Had	Randy Ribay	Gold	

=== Nonfiction ===
California Book Award for Nonfiction winners
Year	Category	Title	Author	Result	Ref.
1931	Nonfiction-Memoir	Crowded Year: The Reminiscences of William G. McAdoo	William McAdoo	Gold	
1931	Nonfiction-Memoir	The Autobiography of Lincoln Steffens	Lincoln Steffens	Silver	
1931	Scholarship-History	Outpost of Empire	Herbert E. Bolton	Gold	
1932	Nonfiction-Memoir	The Adventures of a Novelist	Gertrude Anderson	Gold	
1933	Nonfiction-Memoir	San Francisco: A Pageant	Charles Dobie	Gold	
1933	Nonfiction-Memoir	Deep Water: The Autobiography of a Sea Captain	Ernest Pryce Mitchell	Silver	
1933	Scholarship-Study	The Pursuit of Death: A Study of Shelley’s Poetry	B. P. Kurtz	Silver	
1934	Nonfiction-Memoir	A Child Went Forth: The Autobiography of Dr. Helen Doyle	Helen Doyle	Gold	
1934	Scholarship-History	The Revolutionary Emperor: Joseph II of Austria	Saul Padover	Silver	
1934	Scholarship	The Saga of the Comstock Lode	George Lyman	Gold	
1935	General Scholarship	Tortilla Flat	John Steinbeck	Silver	
1935	Nonfiction	San Francisco Tales	Charles Dobie	Gold	
1935	Nonfiction	All Giants Wear Yellow Breeches: A Chronicle of Boyhood	Vernon Patterson	Silver	
1935	Scholarship	Literature and Society	Albert Guerard	Gold	
1936	Scholarship	God and Man’s Destiny: Inquiries into the metaphysical foundations of faith	Hartley Alexander	Gold	
1936	Scholarship	Rim of Christendom: A Biography of Eusebio Francisco Kino, Pacific Coast Pioneer	Herbert E. Bolton	Gold	
1936	Scholarship	Ordeal by Hunger: The Story of the Donner Party	George Stewart	Silver	
1936	Scholarship	Snow Covered Wagons: A Pioneer Epic: The Donner Party 1846-1847	Julia Altrocchi	Silver	
1937	Scholarship	Men of Mathematics	E. T. Bell	Gold	
1937	Scholarship	The Early Stuarts: 1603 to 1660	Godfrey Davies	Silver	
1937	Scholarship	People on the Earth	Edwin Corle	Silver	
1938	Nonfiction-Memoir	Enchanted Vagabonds	Dana and Ginger Lamb	Gold	
1938	Nonfiction	Gone Are the Days	Alexander Powell	Silver	
1938	Scholarship	France Overseas: A Study of Modern Imperialism	Herbert Priestley	Gold	
1938	Scholarship	The Big Four	Oscar Lewis	Silver	
1939	Nonfiction-Memoir	Land Below the Wind	Agnes Keith	Gold	
1939	Scholarship	San Francisco’s Literary Frontier	Franklin Walker	Gold	
1939	Scholarship	Flowering Earth	Donald Peattie	Silver	
1940	Nonfiction	My Name Is Aram	William Saroyan	Silver	
1940	Scholarship	The Structure of Art	Carl Thurston	Gold	
1940	Scholarship	A Diplomatic History of the American People	Thomas Bailey	Gold	
1940	Scholarship	The March of the Barbarians	Harold Lamb	Silver	
1941	Nonfiction	Lord of Alaska: Baranov and the Russian Adventure	Hector Chevigny	Gold	
1941	Nonfiction	The Morning of America	Frank Klingberg	Silver	
1941	Nonfiction-Biography	Thackeray	John Dobbs	Silver	
1941	Scholarship	Many Mexicos	Lesley B. Simpson	Gold	
1942	Scholarship	History of Historical Writing	James Westfall Thompson	Gold	
1943	Nonfiction	Brothers Under the Skin	Carey McWilliams	Gold	
1943	Nonfiction	The Day of Reckoning	Max Radin	Silver	
1943	Scholarship	Legacy of Nazism	Frank Munk	Gold	
1944	Nonfiction	Caesar and Christ: A History of Roman Civilization and of Christianity from Their Beginnings to A.D. 325	Will Durant	Gold	
1944	Nonfiction	Forward Observer	Edwin Westrate	Silver	
1944	Scholarship	Woodrow Wilson and the Lost Peace	Thomas Bailey	Gold	
1945	Scholarship	The Age of the Great Depression: 1929-1941	Laura Hinkley	Gold	
1945	Scholarship	The Epic of Latin America	John A. Crow	Gold	
1945	Nonfiction	Minor Heresies, Major Departures: A China Mission Boyhood	John Espey	Gold	
1945	Nonfiction	South America Called Them: Explorations of the Great Naturalists	Victor Von Hagen	Silver	
1946	Nonfiction	The Christian Heritage in America	George Hedley	Silver	
1946	Nonfiction	Theodore Roosevelt and the Progressive Movement	George Mowry	Silver	
1947	Nonfiction	The Great Forest	Richard Lillard	Silver	
1947	Nonfiction	A Yanqui in Patagonia	Bailey Willis	Silver	
1947	Scholarship	The Atlantic Frontier: Colonial American Civilization, 1607-1763	Louis Wright	Gold	
1948	Nonfiction	The Big Divide	David Lavender	Silver	
1948	Nonfiction	The Legend of Henry Ford	Keith Sward	Silver	
1948	Scholarship	The Age of the Great Depression: 1929-1941	Dixon Wecter	Gold	
1949	Nonfiction	The Universe of GBS	William Irvine	Gold	
1949	Nonfiction	To Hell and Back	Audie Murphy	Silver	
1950	Nonfiction	Sea Road to the Indies: An Account of the Voyages and Exploits of the Portuguese Navigators, Together with the Life and Times of Dom Vasco da Gama, Capitao-Mor, Viceroy of India and Count of Vidigueira Indies	Henry Hersch Hart	Gold	
1950	Nonfiction	Educating our Daughters: A Challenge to the Colleges	Lynn White	Silver	
1950	Nonfiction	Fifth Chinese Daughter	Jade Snow Wong	Silver	
1951	Nonfiction	The True Believer: Thoughts on the Nature of Mass Movements	Eric Hoffer	Gold	
1951	Nonfiction	The Negro and the Communist Party	Wilson Record	Silver	
1951	Nonfiction	Ark of Empire: San Francisco’s Montgomery Block	Idwal Jones	Silver	
1952	Nonfiction	Boss Ruef’s San Francisco: The Story of the Union Labor Party, Big Business, and the Graft Prosecution	Walton Bean	Gold	
1952	Nonfiction	Cottrell: Samaritan of Science	Frank Cameron	Gold	
1952	Nonfiction	Please Excuse Johnny	Florence Mcghee	Silver	
1953	Nonfiction	It’s Good to be Black	Ruby Goodwin	Gold	
1953	Nonfiction	Yankee Ships: An Informal History of the American Merchant Marine	Reese Wolfe	Silver	
1954	Nonfiction	Howells and the Age of Realism	Everett Carter	Gold	
1954	Nonfiction	Beyond the Hundredth Meridian: John Wesley Poiwell and the Second Opening of the West	Wallace Stegner	Silver	
1954	Nonfiction	Glory, God, and Gold	Paul Wellman	Silver	
1955	Nonfiction	Cities in Revolt: Urban Life in America 1773-1776	Carl Bridenbaugh	Gold	
1955	Nonfiction	Notre-Dame of Paris	Alan Temko	Gold	
1955	Nonfiction	Streets of San Francisco	Samuel Dickson	Silver	
1956	Nonfiction	The Nun's Story	Kathryn Hulme	Gold	
1956	Nonfiction	Tales of a Teacher	Beatrice S. Nathan	Gold	
1956	Nonfiction	James Wilson, Founding Father: 1742-1798	Charles Page Smith	Silver	
1957	Nonfiction	Elizabethans at Home	Lu Emily Pearson	Gold	
1958	Nonfiction	Mistress to an Age: A Life of Madame de Stael	J. Christopher Herold	Gold	
1958	Nonfiction	Era of Theodore Roosevelt: 1900-1912	George Mowry	Silver	
1958	Nonfiction	Land of Giants: Drive to the Pacific Northwest, 1750-1950	David Lavender	Silver	
1959	Nonfiction	Alexander Hamilton: A Portrait in Paradox	John C. Miller	Gold	
1959	Nonfiction	End of American Innocence	Henry F. May	Silver	
1959	Nonfiction	Thaddeus Stevens: Scourge of the South	Fawn Brodie	Silver	
1960	Nonfiction	Chancellor Robert R. Livingston of New York: 1746-1813	George Dangerfield	Gold	
1960	Nonfiction	The War For the Union War Becomes Revolution 1862-1863	Allan Nevins	Silver	
1961	Nonfiction	Sinclair Lewis: An American Life	Mark Schorer	Gold	
1961	Nonfiction	Forth to the Wilderness	Dale Van Every	Silver	
1962	Nonfiction	Franz Kafka: Parable and Paradox	Heinz Politzer	Gold	
1962	Nonfiction	John Adams	Page Smith	Gold	
1962	Nonfiction	Adolph Autro: A Biography	Robert and Mary Stewart	Silver	
1963	Nonfiction	The Hemlock and the Cross: Humanism, Socrates, and Christ	Geddes MacGregor	Gold	
1963	Nonfiction	A History of Russia	Nicholas Riasanovsky	Gold	
1963	Nonfiction	Ah, Julian! A Memoir of Julian Brodetsky	Leonard Wibberley	Silver	
1963	Nonfiction	James Gibbons Huneker: Critic of the Seven Arts	Arnold Schwab	Silver	
1964	Nonfiction	Andreas Vesalius of Brussels	C. D. O'Malley	Gold	
1965	Nonfiction	The Search for Meriwether Lewis: From Tillamook to Grinder's Stand	Richard Dillon	Gold	
1965	Nonfiction	Blue Hen's Chick: A Life in Context	A. B. Guthrie	Gold	
1965	Nonfiction	Oil, Land, and Politics: The California Career of Thomas Robert Bard	W. H. Hutchinson	Gold	
1965	Nonfiction	Cellist	Gregor Piatigorsky	Silver	
1965	Nonfiction	Final Challenge: The American Frontier 1804-1845	Dale Van Every	SIlver	
1966	Nonfiction	The Cave and the Mountain: A Study of EM Forster	Winfred Stone	Gold	
1966	Nonfiction	The Stone Mason of Tor House: The Life and Works of Robinson Jeffers	Melba Bennett	Gold	
1966	Nonfiction	The Ordeal of the Constitution	Robert Rutland	Silver	
1966	Nonfiction	Leonard Pitt Decline of the Californios A Social History of the Spanish-Speaking Californians, 1846-1890	Leonard Pitt	Silver	
1967	Nonfiction	Robert Lee. A Complete Man: A Portrait	Margaret Sanborn	Gold	
1967	Nonfiction	The Young Stalin: The Early Years of an Elusive Revolutionary	Edward Ellis Smith	Silver	
1967	Nonfiction	Fathers	Herbert Gold	Silver	
1968	Nonfiction	The Sane Positivist: Biography of Edward Thorndike	Geraldine Joncich	Gold	
1968	Nonfiction	Heroic Mexico: The Violent Emergence of a Modern Nation	William Weber Johnson	Gold	
1968	Nonfiction	The Immigrant Upraised	Andrew Rolle	Silver	
1969	Nonfiction	With Bold Knife and Fork	MFK Fisher	Gold	
1969	Nonfiction	Business at Bay: Critics and Heretics of American Business	Irving Michelman	Silver	
1969	Nonfiction	German: Illusions and Dilemmas	Carl Landauer	Silver	
1970	Nonfiction	Asian Ideas of the East and West	Stephen N. Hay	Gold	
1970	Nonfiction	The Rise of Modern China	Immanuel Hsu	Silver	
1970	Nonfiction	Interpretations of Life	Will Durant	Silver	
1971	Nonfiction	The Autobiography of Miss Jane Pittman	Ernest Gaines	Silver	
1971	Nonfiction	Monarchy in the Emporer's Eyes	Harold L. Kahn	Silver	
1972	Nonfiction	Contour in Time	Travis Bogard	Gold	
1972	Nonfiction	The Pound Era	Hugh Kenner	Silver	
1972	Nonfiction	Mao's Way	Edward E. Rice	Silver	
1972	Nonfiction	Sand in a Whirlwind	Ferol Egan	Silver	
1973	Nonfiction	Americans and the California Dream	Kevin Starr	Gold	
1973	Nonfiction	Steinbeck Country	Steve Crouch	Gold	
1973	Nonfiction	Gideon Welles	John Niven	Silver	
1974	Nonfiction	Ascent of Man	Jacob Bronowski	Gold	
1975	Nonfiction	Rape of the Nile	Brian Fagan	Gold	
1975	Nonfiction	The Opium War	Peter Ward Fay	Silver	
1975	Nonfiction	Age of Napoleon	Will and Ariel Durant	Silver	
1975	Nonfiction	Romantic Revolutionary	Robert Rosenstone	Silver	
1976	Nonfiction	Peasants into Frenchmen: The Modernization of Rural France, 1870-1914	Eugen Weber	Silver	
1977	Nonfiction	Botanical Prints	Henry Evans	Silver	
1977	Nonfiction	Fremont: Explorer for a Restless Nation	Ferol Egan	Silver	
1978	Nonfiction	Max Perkins: Editor of Genius	A. Scott Berg	Gold	
1978	Nonfiction	Germany 1866-1945	Gordon Craig	Silver	
1978	Nonfiction	St. Nicholas of Myra, Bari, Manhattan	Charles W. Jones	Silver	
1979	Nonfiction	Been in the Storm so Long	Leon Litwack	Silver	
1979	Nonfiction	Sea Glass	Laurence Yep	Silver	
1979	Nonfiction	Symbols of Eternity: Art of Landscape Painting in China	Michael Sullivan	Silver	
1979	Nonfiction	Urban Crucible: Social Change, Political Consciousness, and the Origins of the American Revolution	Gary B. Nash	Silver	
1980	Nonfiction	Translating Neruda: Way to Macchu Picchu	John Felstiner	Gold	
1980	Nonfiction	Imperiled Union: Essays on the Civil War	Kenneth Stampp	Silver	
1980	Nonfiction	Revolutionary People at War: The Continental Army and American Character, 1775-1783	Charles Royster	Silver	
1981	Nonfiction	Hunger of Memory: The Education of Richard Rodriguez	Richard Rodriguez	Gold	
1981	Nonfiction	Pursuit of a Dream	Janet S. Hermann	Silver	
1981	Nonfiction	Will's Boy	Wright Morris	Silver	
1982	Nonfiction	The Glorious Cause: The American Revolution, 1763–1789	Robert Middlekauff	Gold	
1983	Nonfiction	The First Elizabeth	Carolly Erickson	Gold	
1983	Nonfiction	French Gothic Architecture 12th-13th Century	Jean Bony	Gold	
1984	Nonfiction	Above Paris	Robert Cameron	Silver	
1985	Nonfiction	A History of Architecture Settings	Spiro Kostof	Gold	
1986	Nonfiction	France: Fin De Siecle	Eugen Weber	Gold	
1986	Nonfiction	Giovanni and Lusanna: Love and Marriage in Renaissance Florence	Gene Brucker	Silver	
1987	Nonfiction	Chaucer: His Life, His Works, His World	Donald R. Howard	Gold	
1987	Nonfiction	And the Band Played On: Politics, People, and the AIDS Epidemic	Randy Shilts	Silver	
1987	Nonfiction	Voyage of Discovery: Captain Crook and the Exploration of the Pacific	Lynne Withey	Silver	
1988	Nonfiction	The Way to the Western Sea: Lewis & Clark Across the Continent	David Lavender	Silver	
1988	Nonfiction	Green Architecture & The Agrarian Garden	Barbara S. Solomon	Silver	
1988	Nonfiction	Picasso's Guernica, hist	Herschel Chipp	Silver	
1989	Nonfiction	Strangers from a Different Shore	Ronald Takaki	Gold	
1990	Nonfiction	Sacred Mountains of the World	Edwin Bernbaum	Gold	
1990	Nonfiction	The Knight, Death, and the Devil	Ella Leffland	Silver	
1990	Nonfiction	America in 1857: Nation on the Brink	Kenneth Stampp	Silver	
1991	Nonfiction	Anne Sexton: A Biography	Diane Middlebrook	Gold	
1991	Nonfiction	Backlash: The Undeclared War Against American Women	Susan Faludi	Silver	
1992	Nonfiction	Triumph and Tragedy: A History of the Mexican People	Ramón Eduardo Ruiz	Gold	
1992	Nonfiction	Days of Obligation: An Argument with my Mexican Father	Richard Rodriguez	Silver	
1993	Nonfiction	Opera in America: A Cultural History	John Dizikes	Gold	
1993	Nonfiction	No Way to Build a Ballpark and Other Irreverent Essays in Architecture	Allan Temko	Silver	
1994	Nonfiction	The Odyssey of the Abraham Lincoln Brigade: Americans in the Spanish Civil War	Peter Carroll	Silver	
1994	Nonfiction	School Girls	Peggy Orenstein	Silver	
1995	Nonfiction	Poles Apart	Galen Rowell	Silver	
1995	Nonfiction	Possible Lives	Mike Rose	Silver	
1996	Nonfiction	Holy Land: A Suburban Memoir	D. J. Waldie	Gold	
1996	Nonfiction	Lisa Meitner	Ruth Sime	Silver	
1997	Nonfiction	Guns, Germs and Steel: The Fates of Human Societies	Jared Diamond	Gold	
1997	Nonfiction	Glenn Gould: The Ecstasy and Tragedy of Genius	Peter Oswald	Silver	
1998	Nonfiction	King Leopold's Ghost	Adam Hochschild	Gold	
1998	Nonfiction	All on Fire	Henry Mayer	Silver	
1999	Nonfiction	Freedom from Fear: The American People in Depression and War, 1929-1945	David Kennedy	Gold	
1999	Nonfiction	Salvation at Stake: Christian Martyrdom in Early Modern Europe	Brad Gregory	Silver	
2000	Nonfiction	Our Vietnam	A.J. Langguth	Gold	
2001	Nonfiction	American Colonies	Alan Taylor	Gold	
2002	Nonfiction	Brown: The Last Discovery of America	Richard Rodriguez	Gold	
2002	Nonfiction	American Law in the 20th Century	Lawerance Friedman	Silver	
2003	Nonfiction	River of Shadows: Eadweard Muybridge and the Technological Wild West	Rebecca Solnit	Gold	
2003	Nonfiction	American Expressionism: Art and Social Change	Bram Dijkstra	Silver	
2004	Nonfiction	Sorrow of Empire	Chalmers Johnson	Gold	
2005	Nonfiction	Bury the Chains: Prophets and Rebels in the Fight to Free an Empire Slaves	Adam Hochschild	Gold	
2005	Nonfiction	Collapse: How Societies Choose to Fail or Succeed	Jared Diamond	Silver	
2006	Nonfiction	The Omnivore's Dilemma: A Natural History of Four Meals	Michael Pollan	Gold	
2006	Nonfiction	Enrique's Journey: The Story of a Boy's Dangerous Odyssey to Reunite with His Mother	Sonia Nazario	Silver	
2007	Nonfiction	Ralph Ellison: A Biography	Arnold Rampersad	Gold	
2007	Nonfiction	What Hath God Wrought: The Transformation of America, 1815–1848	David Walker Howe	Silver	
2008	Nonfiction	Hallelujah Junction: Composing an American Life	John Adams	Gold	
2008	Nonfiction	Mustang: The Saga of the Wild Horse in the American West	Deanne Stillman	Silver	
2009	Nonfiction	A Paradise Built in Hell	Rebecca Solnit	Gold	
2009	Nonfiction	Imperial	William T. Vollmann	Silver	
2009	Nonfiction	Leaving India	Minal Hajratwala	Silver	
2010	Nonfiction	Charlie Chan: The Untold Story of the Honorable Detective and His Rendezvous with American History	Yunte Huang	Gold	
2010	Nonfiction	The Harvard Psychedelic Club	Don Lattin	Silver	
2011	Nonfiction	Chasing Aphrodite: The Hunt for Looted Antiquities at the World's Richest Museum	Jason Felch	Gold	
2011	Nonfiction	The Ecstasy of Influence: Nonfiction, Etc.	Jonathan Lethem	Silver	
2012	Nonfiction	God's Hotel: A Doctor, A Hospital, and A Pilgrimage to the Heart of Medicine	Victoria Sweet	Gold	
2012	Nonfiction	The Lady in Gold: The Extraordinary Tale of Gustav Klimt's Masterpiece, Portrait of Adele-Bloch Bauer	Anne-Marie O'Connor	Silver	
2013	Nonfiction	Command and Control	Eric Schlosser	Gold	
2013	Nonfiction	Farewell Fred Voodoo: A Letter From Haiti	Amy Wilentz	Silver	
2014	Nonfiction	The Crusades of Cesar Chavez	Miriam Pawel	Gold	
2014	Nonfiction	Deep Down Dark	Héctor Tobar	Silver	
2015	Nonfiction	Ghettoside	Jill Leovy	Gold	
2015	Nonfiction	NeuroTribes	Steve Silberman	Silver	
2016	Nonfiction	The Other Slavery	Andrés Reséndez	Gold	
2016	Nonfiction	Engineering Eden	Jordan Fisher Smith	Silver	
2017	Nonfiction	The Color of Law	Richard Rothstein	Gold	
2017	Nonfiction	The Far Away Brothers	Lauren Markham	Silver	
2018	Nonfiction	The Library Book	Susan Orlean	Gold	
2018	Nonfiction	American Prison	Shane Bauer	Silver	
2019	Nonfiction	The Heartbeat of Wounded Knee	David Treuer	Gold	
2019	Nonfiction	Know My Name: A Memoir	Chanel Miller	Silver	
2021	Nonfiction	South to Freedom	Alice L. Baumgartner	Gold	
2021	Nonfiction	Golden Gates	Conor Dougherty	Silver	
2022	Nonfiction	Paraside	Lizzie Johnson	Gold	
2022	Nonfiction	Light on Fire	Gabrielle Selz	Silver	
2023	Nonfiction	American Midnight	Adam Hochschild	Gold	
2023	Nonfiction	The Man Who Could Move Clouds	Ingrid Rojas Contreras	Silver	
2023	Nonfiction	Bad Mexicans	Kelly Lylte Hernandez	Silver	
2024	Nonfiction	Orphan Bachelors	Fae Myenne Ng	Gold	
2025	Nonfiction	Frostbite: How Refrigeration Changed Our Food, Our Planet, and Ourselves	Nicola Twilley	Gold	
2025	Nonfiction	Twelve Trees: The Deep Roots of Our Future	Daniel Lewis	Silver	

=== Poetry ===
California Book Award for Poetry winners
Year	Title	Author	Result	Ref.
1940	In What Hour	Kenneth Rexroth	Silver	
1942	Proud Riders	H. L. Davis	Gold	
1944	The Phoenix and the Tortoise	Kenneth Rexroth	Silver	
1946	The Faultless Shore	Edward Weismiller	Silver	
1947	Journey to Victory	Hazel Louise Zimmerman	Silver	
1949	The Beast in His Hunger	Harry Brown	SIlver	
1950	Dominant Seventh	Phillips Kloss	Silver	
1951	Old Cronies	Leon Richardson	Silver	
1955	Symphony	Delina Margot-Pride	Silver	
1958	Magellan	Ann Stanford	Silver	
1961	A Ring of Willows	Eric Barker	Silver	
1964	Girl with Ocelot	Julia Altrocchi	Silver	
1965	The Selected Poems	Louis Simpson	Silver	
1967	The Rose of Solitude	Brother Antoninus	Silver	
1969	Short History of the Fur Trade	Andrian Stoutenburg	Silver	
1970	Testament for My Students	Kay Boyle	Silver	
1971	More Under Saturn	William Dickey	Silver	
1973	A Sense of Place	Celeste T. Wright	Silver	
1973	Living Together	Edgar Bowers	Silver	
1975	Returning Your Call	Leonard Nathan	Silver	
1976	Jack Straw's Castle	Thom Gunn	Gold	
1976	Adult Bookstore	Karl Shapiro	Silver	
1977	In Mediterranean Air	Ann Stanford	Silver	
1978	Songs for Wanderers	Sheila Moon	Silver	
1979	The Morning Star	Kenneth Rexroth	Silver	
1979	Dear Blood	Leonard Nathan	SIlver	
1981	Poems Old and New, 1918-1978	Janet Lewis	Silver	
1982	Spacks Street: New and Selected Poems	Barry Spacks	Silver	
1983	Collected Poems, 1930-83	Josephine Miles	Silver	
1984	Over All the Obscene Boundaries	Lawrence Ferlinghetti	Silver	
1985	The Countess of Forli	Ann Stanford	Silver	
1985	Early Light	W.S. Di Piero	Silver	
1986	Left Out in the Rain	Gary Snyder	Silver	
1986	Sapphics Against Anger and Other Poems	Timothy Steele	Silver	
1988	Collected Poems, 1931-83	Czesław Miłosz	Silver	
1988	Of Gravity and Angels	Jane Hirshfield	Silver	
1989	Dead Languages	David Shields	Silver	
1989	Fortress	Brenda Hillman	Silver	
1989	Human Wishes	Robert Hass	Silver	
1991	Provinces: Poems 1987-91	Czesław Miłosz	Silver	
1991	What Work Is	Philip Levine	Silver	
1993	Lost Body	Terry Ehret	Silver	
1994	The October Palace	Jane Hirshfield	Silver	
1994	The Philosopher's Club	Kim Addonizio	Silver	
1995	Lights & Mysteries	Thomas Centolella	Silver	
1995	Red Sauce, Whiskey & Snow	August Kleinzahler	Silver	
1996	Harping On: Poems	Carolyn Kizer	Silver	
1996	Sun Under Wood	Robert Hass	Silver	
1997	A Far Rockaway of the Heart	Lawrence Ferlinghetti	Silver	
1998	The Art of the Lathe	B. H. Fairchild	Silver	
1998	Mrs. Dumpty	Chana Bloch	Silver	
1999	The Mercy	Philip Levine	Silver	
1999	The Potato Eaters	Leonard Nathan	Silver	
2000	Selected Poems	Fanny Howe	Gold	
2001	New and Collected Poems 1931-2001	Czesław Miłosz	Gold	
2001	Cool, Calm & Collected: Poems 1960-2001	Carolyn Kizer	Silver	
2002	Early Occult Memory Systems of the Lower Midwest	B. H. Fairchild	Gold	
2003	The Strange Hours Travelers Keep	August Kleinzahler	Gold	
2004	School Among the Ruins	Adrienne Rich	Gold	
2005	Niagara River	Kay Ryan	Gold	
2006	New and Collected Poems, 1964-2006	Ishmael Reed	Gold	
2007	Chinese Apples	W. S. Di Piero	Gold	
2008	Sleeping it Off in Rapid City: Poems, New & Selected	August Kleinzahler	Gold	
2008	Practice	Dan Bellm	Silver	
2009	Chronic	D.A. Powell	Gold	
2010	Mortal Geography	Alexandra Teague	Gold	
2010	Suck on the Marrow	Camille T. Dungy	Silver	
2011	Ascension	Giovanni Singleton	Gold	
2012	Sea and Fog	Etel Adnan	Gold	
2013	Seasonal Works with Letter on Fire	Brenda Hillman	Gold	
2013	The Boss	Victoria Chang	Silver	
2014	The Feel Trio	Fred Moten	Gold	
2015	Cancer Angel	Beth Murray	Gold	
2016	Restless Continent	Aja Couchois Duncan	Gold	
2016	Buck Studies	Douglas Kearney	Silver	
2017	Heaven is All Goodbyes	Tongo Eisen-Martin	Gold	
2018	Total Recall	Samantha Giles	Gold	
2019	Magical Negro	Morgan Parker	Gold	
2019	Jazz Funeral for Uncle Tom	Harmony Holiday	Silver	
2021	Quiet Orient Riot	Nathalie Khankan	Gold	
2022	Refractive Africa	Will Alexander	Gold	
2023	Time Regime	Jhani Randhawa	Gold	
2024	Mass for Shut-Ins	Mary-Alice Daniels	Gold	
2025	Theophanies	Sarah Ghazal Ali	Gold	
2025	Ward Toward	Cindy Juyoung Ok	Silver	

== Controversy ==
The California Book awards sparked controversy in 1940 after awarding John Steinbeck his third Gold Medal for The Grapes of Wrath, which triggered a series of protests throughout the state. The Club was criticized for acknowledging a book that portrayed California in a poor light. It didn't take long, however, for The Grapes of Wrath to be considered an American classic.

== See also ==
- California Historical Society Book Award
