= The Singing Cave =

The Singing Cave may refer to:

== Caves ==
- The Singing Cave, located in Todd County, Kentucky
- Saunghellir (The Singing Cave), located in Iceland near Húsafell
- Eder-Kuillar (The Singing Caves), located in Tuva

== Art and literature ==
- The Singing Cave, alternate title for Barbary Hoard, a 1952 pulp novel by John Appleby
- The Singing Cave (Beames book), a 2009 book by Margaret Beames
- The Singing Cave (Dillon novel), a 1960 novel by Eilís Dillon
- The Singing Cave (Leighton novel), a 1945 book by Margaret Carver Leighton
