= Quest for the Lost City =

- Directed by: Dana Lamb
- Written by: Dorothy Howell
- Based on: Enchanted Vagabonds by Dana Lamb
- Produced by: Sol Lesser; Dorothy Howell
- Cinematography: Dana Lamb; Ginger Lamb
- Edited by: Robert Leo
- Music by: Paul Sawtell
- Production company: Sol Lesser Productions
- Distributed by: RKO Radio Pictures
- Release date: May 4, 1955 (US)
- Running time: 64 minutes
- Country: United States
- Language: English

Quest for the Lost City is a 1955 American documentary film which follows the travels of the travel writing team of Dana and Ginger Lamb, as they hike through the jungles of Central America. Produced by Sol Lesser Productions, it was distributed by RKO Radio Pictures, and released on May 4, 1955. The film features an introduction by Heisman Trophy winner Tom Harmon, who used a survival kit developed by the Lambs during his days as an Army Air Force pilot during World War II. The film is based on the autobiographical book by the Lambs, entitled Quest for the lost city.

== See also ==
- List of American films of 1955
