= Ruth Madievsky =

Moldovan-American novelist, poet, and pharmacist

- Born: Chișinău, Moldova
- Education: University of Southern California (PharmD)
- Occupations: Novelist, poet, pharmacist
- Writing career
- Notable works: All-Night Pharmacy (2023); Emergency Brake (2016)
- Notable awards: California Book Award for First Fiction (2024); National Jewish Book Award for Debut Fiction (2024); Stanley Kunitz Memorial Prize (2017)

Ruth Madievsky is an American novelist, poet, and clinical pharmacist. She is the author of the novel All-Night Pharmacy (2023) and the poetry collection Emergency Brake (2016).

== Early life and education ==
Madievsky was born in Chișinău, Moldova. Her family immigrated to the United States in 1993 when she was two years old, settling in Los Angeles as Jewish refugees. She grew up in West Hollywood, initially living with her parents, grandparents, and great-grandmother in a shared apartment in the Soviet diaspora area of the city. Her father is a gastroenterologist and her mother a pharmacist.

She attended the University of Southern California, where she participated in the Trojan Admission Pre-Pharmacy (TAP) program. Madievsky earned her Doctor of Pharmacy (PharmD) from the USC Alfred E. Mann School of Pharmacy and Pharmaceutical Sciences. While attending pharmacy school, she pursued her interest in creative writing by attending events in USC's Creative Writing PhD program and arranged informal meetings with visiting author T.C. Boyle, to whom she would show her short stories.

== Career ==
=== Clinical pharmacy work ===
Madievsky works as an HIV and primary care clinical pharmacist. In 2018, she received her HIV pharmacist credential and helped establish an inpatient HIV pharmacist service at her hospital.

=== Literary career ===
==== Poetry ====
Madievsky's debut poetry collection, Emergency Brake, was published by Tavern Books in 2016 as their 2015 Wrolstad Contemporary Poetry Series selection. According to her website, the collection spent five months on Small Press Distribution's Poetry Bestsellers list.

Madievsky won The American Poetry Review's Stanley Kunitz Memorial Prize in 2017 for her poem "Wormhole." She was a 2015 Tin House Summer Workshop scholar in poetry.

Her poetry and essays have been published in The New York Times, The Atlantic, The Los Angeles Times, Harper's Bazaar, The Cut, GQ, Tin House, Kenyon Review, Ploughshares, Guernica, Literary Hub, and the Academy of American Poets' Poem-a-Day.

==== Fiction ====
All-Night Pharmacy, Madievsky's debut novel, was published by Catapult in July 2023. The book began as a linked short story collection that Madievsky started writing in 2014 while attending pharmacy school. The novel follows an unnamed narrator and her relationship with her older sister Debbie, exploring themes of addiction and intergenerational trauma within a Soviet Jewish immigrant family in Los Angeles.

The novel reached the USA Today bestseller list. The New York Times described it as "tender and hilarious." The book was selected as an Indie Next Pick and was named to best or most anticipated book lists for 2023 by publications including NPR, The Los Angeles Times, Vanity Fair, Vogue, and Literary Hub.

In interviews, Madievsky has cited Denis Johnson's Jesus' Son, Rachel Kushner's The Flamethrowers, and Ottessa Moshfegh's My Year of Rest and Relaxation as influences.

== Awards and recognition ==
All-Night Pharmacy received the following awards:

- California Book Award for First Fiction (2024)
- National Jewish Book Award for Debut Fiction (2024)

The novel was a finalist for the Lambda Literary Award for Bisexual Fiction.

Madievsky's other awards include the Stanley Kunitz Memorial Prize from The American Poetry Review (2017).

== Other activities ==
=== Cheburashka Collective ===
Madievsky is a co-founder of the Cheburashka Collective, a community of women and nonbinary writers whose identities have been shaped by immigration from the Soviet Union to the United States.

=== Journalism and interviews ===
Madievsky has contributed essays to publications including The New York Times, The Atlantic, Harper's Bazaar, and The Cut. She has conducted author interviews for Interview Magazine, Vanity Fair, BOMB, and Electric Literature.

== Personal life ==
Madievsky lives in Los Angeles and works as an HIV and primary care clinical pharmacist. In 2019, she visited Moldova and Russia for the first time since her family's immigration.

== Bibliography ==
=== Novels ===
- All-Night Pharmacy (Catapult, 2023) ISBN 978-1646221509

=== Poetry collections ===
- Emergency Brake (Tavern Books, 2016) ISBN 978-1935635536

== See also ==
- Moldovan Americans
- Jewish American literature
