= Ruth Lilly Poetry Prize =

American poetry award

The Ruth Lilly Poetry Prize is awarded annually by The Poetry Foundation, which also publishes Poetry magazine. The prize was established in 1986 by Ruth Lilly. It honors a living U.S. poet whose "lifetime accomplishments warrant extraordinary recognition"; its value is $100,000 making it one of the richest literary prizes in the world. Mary Carole McCauley, writing for the Los Angeles Times, called it "among the most prestigious awards that can be won by an American poet".

== Winners ==
The following list is based on the listing by the Poetry Foundation.

- 1986: Adrienne Rich
- 1987: Philip Levine
- 1988: Anthony Hecht
- 1989: Mona Van Duyn
- 1990: Hayden Carruth
- 1991: David Wagoner
- 1992: John Ashbery
- 1993: Charles Wright
- 1994: Donald Hall
- 1995: A. R. Ammons
- 1996: Gerald Stern
- 1997: William Matthews
- 1998: W. S. Merwin
- 1999: Maxine Kumin
- 2000: Carl Dennis
- 2001: Yusef Komunyakaa
- 2002: Lisel Mueller
- 2003: Linda Pastan
- 2004: Kay Ryan
- 2005: C. K. Williams
- 2006: Richard Wilbur
- 2007: Lucille Clifton
- 2008: Gary Snyder
- 2009: Fanny Howe
- 2010: Eleanor Ross Taylor
- 2011: David Ferry
- 2012: W. S. Di Piero
- 2013: Marie Ponsot
- 2014: Nathaniel Mackey
- 2015: Alice Notley
- 2016: Ed Roberson
- 2017: Joy Harjo
- 2018: Martín Espada
- 2019: Marilyn Nelson
- 2020: Marilyn Chin
- 2021: Patricia Smith
- 2022: Sandra Cisneros, CAConrad, Rita Dove, Nikki Giovanni, Juan Felipe Herrera, Angela Jackson, Haki R. Madhubuti, Sharon Olds, Sonia Sanchez, Patti Smith and Arthur Sze
- 2023: Kimiko Hahn
- 2024: Li-Young Lee
- 2025: Rigoberto González

== See also ==
- American poetry
- List of poetry awards
- List of literary awards
- List of years in poetry
- List of years in literature
