= Lisel Mueller =

German-American poet (1924–2020)

- Born: Elisabeth Neumann; February 8, 1924; Hamburg, Germany
- Died: February 21, 2020 (aged 96); Chicago, Illinois, U.S.
- Occupations: Poet; Translator; Academic teacher
- Organizations: University of Chicago; Elmhurst College; Goddard College
- Awards: Lamont Poetry Prize; National Book Award for Poetry; Pulitzer Prize for Poetry; Ruth Lilly Poetry Prize; Order of Merit of the Federal Republic of Germany

Lisel Mueller (born Elisabeth Neumann, February 8, 1924 – February 21, 2020) was a German-born American poet, translator and academic teacher. Her family fled the Nazi regime, and she arrived in the U.S. in 1939 at the age of 15. She worked as a literary critic and taught at the University of Chicago, Elmhurst College and Goddard College. She began writing poetry in the 1950s and published her first collection in 1965, after years of self-study. She received awards including the National Book Award in 1981 and the Pulitzer Prize for Poetry in 1997, as the only German-born poet awarded that prize.

== Life and career ==
Mueller was born Elisabeth Neumann in Hamburg. Her father, Fritz C. Neumann, was a high school teacher at the Gymnasium Alstertal. A progressive educator, he delivered a speech in 1933 to an assembly of Hamburg teachers, warning of the dangers of Nazi ideology. When the Nazis came to power, he was dismissed. Her mother, Ilse (Burmester), an elementary teacher, sustained the family. In 1935, her father was interrogated by the Gestapo for four days. He emigrated, first to Italy, then to the U.S., where he was accepted in 1937 as a political refugee. He became a professor of French and German at Evansville College. She followed with her mother and her younger sister Ingeborg, arriving on 9 June 1939. In the U.S., she used the name Lisel. She graduated from the University of Evansville in 1944. Her mother died in 1953, and she then began to write poetry, publishing the first small collection, Dependencies, in 1965 after twelve years of self-studies.

In 1943, she married Paul Mueller. The couple built a home in the Chicago suburb of Lake Forest, Illinois, in the 1960s, and she wrote: "Though my family landed in the Midwest, we lived in urban or suburban environments." They raised two daughters, Lucy and Jenny. She made money by working as a receptionist in a doctor's office and writing book reviews for the Chicago Daily News, which hired her in the 1970s.

Mueller taught at the University of Chicago, Elmhurst College in Illinois, Goddard College in Plainfield, Vermont, and Warren Wilson College. She stopped publishing after her husband died in 2001 and her vision deteriorated.

During her last years, Mueller resided in a retirement community in Chicago, Illinois. She died on February 21, 2020, at the age of 96.

== Books ==
=== Poetry ===
Mueller's poems often depart from seemingly simple observations. While her work is in English, it reflects her German roots. She sometimes alludes to German fairy-tales by the Brothers Grimm, and quotes Bertold Brecht. In her 1992 autobiographical poem "Curriculum Vitae", she writes: "My country was struck by history more deadly than earthquakes or hurricanes".

Her poems have been described as extremely accessible, yet intricate and layered. While at times whimsical and possessing a sly humor, there is an underlying sadness in much of her work.

- Dependencies (1965)
- Life of a Queen (1970) by Northeast/Juniper Books
- The Private Life (1975) Lamont Poetry Selection
- Voices from the Forest (1977)
- The Need to Hold Still (1980) — winner of the National Book Award
- Second Language (1986)
- Waving from Shore (1989)
- Learning to Play by Ear (1990)
- Alive Together: New & Selected Poems (1996) — winner of the Pulitzer Prize. In 2018, the poems The Story, An Unanswered Question, and Hope were set to a song cycle, "Three Lisel Mueller Settings," by composer Max Raimi, which was featured in the 2023 Grammy-winning album Contemporary American Composers.

=== Translation ===
She published several volumes of translation, including

- Selected Later Poems of Marie Luise Kaschnitz (1980)
- Circe's Mountain, stories by Marie Luise Kaschnitz (1990)

== Awards ==
- 1975: Lamont Poetry Prize for The Private Life
- 1981: National Book Award for Poetry for The Need to Hold Still
- 1990: Carl Sandburg Award
- 1990: National Endowment for the Arts fellowship
- 1997: Pulitzer Prize for Poetry for Alive Together: New & Selected Poems
- 2002: Ruth Lilly Poetry Prize (2002)
- 2019: Order of Merit of the Federal Republic of Germany
