= Jill Leovy =

American journalist and nonfiction writer

Jill Leovy is an American journalist and nonfiction writer. She is best known for the non-fiction book Ghettoside: A True Story of Murder in America, her 2015 New York Times best-seller about homicide in Los Angeles. Leovy argues in Ghettoside that more effort must be given to arresting and incarcerating perpetrators of inner-city murders, because "impunity for the murder of black men remained America’s great, though mostly invisible, race problem."

== Career ==
Leovy spent 24 years as a reporter and editor for The Los Angeles Times. Her work has appeared in The New York Times, The Washington Post, The Wall Street Journal, The Atlantic, and The American Scholar.

She is a senior fellow at the University of Southern California's Annenberg Center on Communication Leadership & Policy and a fellow with the Department of Sociology at Harvard.

== Awards ==
Ghettoside was a finalist for the National Book Critics Circle Award, and it won the gold medal for nonfiction at the 85th Annual California Book Awards. The book was also honored with the Ridenhour Book Prize, the PEN Center USA Prize for research nonfiction and the New York Public Library's Helen Bernstein Book Award for Excellence in Journalism.

== Books ==
- Ghettoside: A True Story of Murder in America (2015)
