= W. S. Di Piero =

American poet

- Awards: Guggenheim Fellowship (1985); Berlin Prize (2002); Ruth Lilly Poetry Prize

William Simone Di Piero is an American poet, translator, essayist, and educator. He has published ten collections of poetry and five collections of essays in addition to his translations. In 2012 Di Piero received the Ruth Lilly Poetry Prize for his lifetime achievement; in making the award, Christian Wiman noted, "He’s a great poet whose work is just beginning to get the wide audience it deserves."

== Life ==
He grew up in South Philadelphia in an Italian-American working-class neighborhood, attended St. Joseph's College in Philadelphia and received a master's degree from San Francisco State University in 1971.

He taught at Louisiana State University, and Northwestern University. In 1982, he joined Stanford University, where he is professor emeritus of English and on faculty in the prestigious Stegner Poetry Workshop. He is an art critic, and curated a photography exhibit of Jonathan Elderfield.

His work appeared in AGNI, Ploughshares, and Triquarterly.

He lives in San Francisco.

== Awards ==
- 2012 Ruth Lilly Poetry Prize for lifetime achievement.
- 2008 California Book Award. Gold medal for Chinese Apples: New and Selected Poems.
- 1998–2001 Lila Wallace-Reader's Digest Fund grant.
- 1996 Academy of American Poets Raiziss/de Palchi Translation Award. Book prize for This Strange Joy: Selected Poems of Sandro Penna.
- 1985 Guggenheim Fellowship.
- Ingram Merrill Fellowship.
- National Endowment for the Arts grant.

== Works ==
=== Poetry collections ===
- The Complaints. Carnegie Mellon University Press; February 15, 2019
- The Man on the Water. MadHat Press; December 15, 2016
- Nitro Nights. Copper Canyon Press. 2011. ISBN 978-1-55659-380-2.
- Chinese Apples: New and Selected Poems. Knopf. 2007. ISBN 978-0-307-26538-8.
- Brother Fire. Random House, Inc. 2006. ISBN 978-0-375-71049-0.
- Skirts and Slacks. Alfred A. Knopf. 2001. ISBN 978-0-375-41153-3.
- Shadows Burning. Northwestern University Press. 1995. ISBN 978-0-8101-5019-5.
- The Restorers. University of Chicago Press. 1992. ISBN 978-0-226-15347-6.
- The Dog Star. University of Massachusetts Press. 1990. ISBN 978-0-87023-704-1.
- Early Light. University of Utah Press. 1985. ISBN 978-0-87480-189-7.
- The Only Dangerous Thing. Elpenor Books. 1984. ISBN 978-0-931972-06-5.
- The First Hour. Abattoir Editions. 1982.
- Country of Survivors: Poems. Eric B. Rasmussen Publishing. 1974.

=== Journal contributions ===
- ""Pacific Surfliner" Now Arriving San Diego". Poetry. March 2008.
- "The Invention of Photography". Three Penny Review. Winter 2009.
- "New Year's Eve at Dave and Sheila's". The Cortland Review. November 1999.
- "Mowers". The New Criterion. April 2004.
- "The fruits of the sea". The New Criterion. November 2006.
- "Overlooking Lake Champlain". Ploughshares. Winter 2006–07. Archived from the original on 2007-05-28.
- "Raven". Poetry Northwest. 5 December 2008.

=== Translations ===
- Sinisgalli, Leonardo (1982). The Ellipse: Selected Poems of Leonardo Sinisgalli. Princeton University Press.
- Penna, Sandro (1982). This Strange Joy: Selected Poems of Sandro Penna. Translator W. S. Di Piero. Ohio State University Press. ISBN 0-8142-0328-0.
- Euripides (1996). Peter Burian (ed.). Ion. Translator W. S. Di Piero. Oxford University Press US. ISBN 978-0-19-509451-0.
- Leopardi, Giacomo (2005). Pensieri. Translator W. S. Di Piero. Il Merlo Press. ISBN 978-0-9759823-6-5.

=== Essays ===
- Fat: New and Uncollected Prose. Carnegie Mellon University Press; November 7, 2020
- City Dog, Northwestern University Press, 2009.
- Shooting the Works: On Poetry and Pictures. Northwestern University Press. 1996. ISBN 978-0-8101-5052-2.
- Out of Eden: Essays on Modern Art. University of California Press. 1991. ISBN 978-0-585-28070-7.
- Memory and Enthusiasm: Essays, 1975-1985. Books on Demand. 1989. ISBN 978-0-608-02527-8.
- "Pollock on Paper". Three Penny Review. Spring 2007.
- "Gots Is What You Got". Three Penny Review. Fall 1994.

=== Anthologies ===
- Jamaica Kincaid, Robert Atwan, ed. (1995). The best American essays. Houghton Mifflin. ISBN 978-0-395-69184-7. "W. S. Di Piero."
- David Foster Wallace; Robert Atwan, eds. (2007). Best American Essays. Houghton Mifflin Company. ISBN 978-0-618-70927-4.

== Online poetry ==
- "The Invention of Photography". The Threepenny Review. Winter 2009.
- "W. S. Di Piero". The Poetry Foundation. 22 June 2021. Links to several poems and articles by Di Piero.
