= J. S. Holliday =

American historian (1924–2006)

Jaquelin Smith Holliday II
- Born: June 10, 1924; Indianapolis, Indiana
- Died: August 31, 2006 (aged 82); Carmel, California
- Spouse: Belinda Vidor Jones

Academic background
- Education: Yale University, University of California, Berkeley

Academic work
- Discipline: Historian
- Sub-discipline: California Gold Rush
- Institutions: Oakland Museum of California, California Historical Society

Jaquelin Smith Holliday II (10 June 1924 – 31 August 2006) was an American historian.

== Notable works ==
Holliday wrote a masterly history of the California Gold Rush that capped three decades of painstaking research on the era.

Holliday's The World Rushed In: The California Gold Rush Experience, first published in 1981, is noteworthy for its innovative narrative style that blends scholarly commentary and analysis with words of the miners themselves and their families.

Kevin Starr, a California historian and former state librarian, describes Holliday as a pioneer of the docudrama narrative. Documentarian Ken Burns featured Holliday in his PBS series The West, and once said "no one writes better about California's irresistible past."

Holliday's narrative drew heavily from the diaries and correspondence of William Swain, a farmer in Youngstown, New York who made a seven-month trek to California in 1849. Swain penned detailed accounts of his transcontinental journey.

Holliday was introduced to Swain's writings during his final year at Yale University. Ed Eberstadt, a dealer in rare books, showed Holliday Swain's diary, which was part of the Yale collection. Eberstadt emphasized that it was the "most important" diary of the Gold Rush, but Holliday initially wasn't impressed with Swain's journals.

After reading diaries left by other 49'ers, Holliday realized the significance of Swain's writings. Most diaries from the Gold Rush were "little more than daily recitations of miles traveled and weather conditions, with an occasional complaint or observation about food, dust or some other discomfort," Holliday once wrote.

== Biography ==
Holliday preferred to go by his first and middle initials. He used the nickname "Jim".

Holliday majored in history at Yale, graduating in 1948. His studies at Yale were interrupted by World War II, during which he served as a lieutenant in the U.S. Navy.

Holliday received a doctorate in history from the University of California, Berkeley in 1958.

He was founding director of the Oakland Museum of California. Holliday's attempt to involve members of Oakland's African American community in the governance of the museum resulted in his dismissal two months before the facility's opening in 1969.

Subsequent to leaving the Oakland Museum, Mr. Holliday served two terms as executive director of the California Historical Society (CHS), 1970-1977 and 1983 to early 1985.

During his first term with CHS, Holliday was responsible for launching the photographic exhibit of Executive Order 9066, concerning the Japanese American incarceration during World War II. The exhibition catalog carried an introduction by the late Edison Uno, one of the two Japanese-Americans who started the drive for the repeal of Title II of the Internal Security Act. In 1972 Executive Order 9066 was shown at The Whitney Museum and simultaneously at the de Young Museum in San Francisco and The Oakland Museum. Many of the images were the work of photographer Dorothea Lange.

Holliday's 2nd wife, Belinda Vidor Jones, was daughter of director King Vidor.

== Works ==
- J. S. Holliday (16 March 2015). The World Rushed In: The California Gold Rush Experience. University of Oklahoma Press. ISBN 978-0-8061-8352-7.
- J. S. Holliday (1999). Rush for Riches: Gold Fever and the Making of California. University of California Press. ISBN 978-0-520-21402-6.
