= Minor Heresies, Major Departures =

Minor Heresies, Major Departures: A China Mission Boyhood is a 1994 book by John Espey, published by University of California Press.

It consists of essays about the author's childhood in China. Reviewer Charlotte L. Beahan stated that there was a specific focus on his childhood role and not on China nor missionary work. Alan Neely of Princeton Theological Seminary described the book as "nontraditional".

The Virginia Quarterly Review compared the work to that of Kenneth Grahame.

== Background ==
Espey previously published other memoirs about his life. He remade some of these and incorporated them into this work. The first such incorporated earlier memoir was written in 1944, and material came from Minor Heresies, Tales Out of School, and The Other City, as well as articles in Harper's Magazine and The New Yorker. Very little new material was first published in this book.

== Contents ==
Beahan described the childhood described as a "cocoon of foreign privilege".

Beahan stated that Espey has "no self-justification" after he acknowledged that he did not attempt to protect a Jewish boy who was bullied.

One chapter, about his Boy Scout experiences, is titled "Le Scouting en Chine". The boys on the expeditions went for entertainment reasons while Chinese adults did the grunt work to facilitate them.

Beahan stated that "Minor Heresies is not a scholarly work."

== Reception ==
Suzanne Wilson Barnett of the University of Puget Sound stated that the writing was done "eloquently". She added that the book illustrates "why Americans feel special ties with China."

Beahan stated that the book is "wonderful".

Steve Bradbury liked how the book focused on daily life in and around the Shanghai International Settlement instead of discussing contemporary politics or trying to analyze Chinese people.

Neely stated that the work seems like "the quieting recollections of a child" as opposed to a standard autobiography.

Mary Ellen Sullivan of Booklist described the work as "delightful".

Lawrence D. Kessler of University of North Carolina, Chapel Hill described the stories as being "delightful" and "funny yet perceptive".

Reviewer Françoise Kriessler stated that the content is "lecture fort agréable" (she enjoyed reading the essays).

The Virginia Quarterly Review described it as "through and through, a light, charming book."
