= David Lavender =

American writer (1910–2003)

- David Lavender, c. 1969
- Born: David Sievert Lavender; February 4, 1910; Telluride, Colorado, US
- Died: April 26, 2003 (aged 93); Ojai, California, US
- Education: Princeton University
- Occupations: Historian, author
- Spouses: Martha Bloom; Mildred Moreland; Muriel Sharkey
- Children: 1
- Writing career
- Genre: History
- Subject: American West

David Sievert Lavender (February 4, 1910 – April 26, 2003) was an American historian and writer who was one of the most prolific chroniclers of the American West. He published more than 40 books, including two novels, several children's books, and a memoir. Unlike his two prominent contemporaries, Bernard DeVoto and Wallace Stegner, Lavender was not an academic. Much of his writing was influenced by his first-hand practical knowledge of the American West and the historical realities and locations depicted in his books—in the mines, on the trails, in the mountains, and on the rivers. Lavender was a two-time nominee for the Pulitzer Prize, and was widely admired by scholars for his accuracy and objectivity.

== Early years ==
David Lavender was born and raised on a cattle ranch 20 miles north of Telluride, Colorado, then a fading mining town. During his early years, he worked as a gold miner and a cowboy. His love of the outdoors led to his becoming an avid mountaineer and dedicated conservationist. Although raised in the rustic mountains of western Colorado, Lavender came from a family that highly valued learning and education. His grandfather was a Colorado supreme court judge, and both his parents were college-educated. Lavender attended Mercersburg Academy in Pennsylvania, and later studied the law and liberal arts at Princeton University.

After graduating in 1931, he briefly attended Stanford Law School before returning to western Colorado to help his stepfather Edgar Lavender run his cattle ranch. After his stepfather died in 1934, he lived on his sizable cattle ranch until the bank repossessed it in 1935. Lavender then moved to Denver, where he worked for an advertising agency and wrote fiction for popular pulp magazines and juvenile publications like Boys' Life.

== Writing career ==
In 1939, Lavender moved to Ojai, California, where he took a teaching job. He sold three short stories to The Saturday Evening Post and went on to contribute to other publications. He began to write about the American West he had experienced growing up—wanting to record a way of life that he felt was slowly fading away. He began to write about his days working in the Camp Bird Mine near Ouray, Colorado, as a miner. The result was a memoir, One Man's West, which was published in 1943. That year, Lavender began teaching English at The Thacher School—a boarding school in Ojai—where he encouraged and supported many young writers. Lavender kept his teaching position at the Thacher School until 1970.

Front cover of One Man's West

The American West of Lavender's early years was still a place of ranchers, miners, cowboys, prospectors, and mountaineers—for most men, a world of backbreaking, lonely, and dangerous work. In One Man's West, however, Lavender did not focus on "the cold and the cruel fatigue", but instead wrote about the "multitude of tiny things which in their sum make up the elemental poetry of rock and ice and snow". Lavender felt compelled to document his experiences in rugged southwest Colorado to preserve what he saw as a rapidly disappearing way of life. The book is filled with unique characters and personal stories, narrated in a warm conversational style.

In 1948, Lavender followed up his successful memoir with The Big Divide, a history of the Rocky Mountain region that established his reputation as a serious historian. The critical and commercial success of these two books launched Lavender's literary career.

In 1954, Lavender published Bent's Fort, an historic landmark of the American West on the upper Arkansas River in present-day southeastern Colorado. Built by Charles and William Bent, Bent's Fort was a massive private fort that stood until 1849 as the center of trade with the Indians of the central plains. Lavender's history of these men and their role in opening up the southwestern region of North America has been compared to the works of eminent historians such as Francis Parkman and William H. Prescott.

In 1958, Lavender wrote The Trail to Santa Fe, about Zebulon Pike and his exploration of the American Southwest in present-day Missouri, Kansas, Colorado, and New Mexico. The book captures the turbulent adventures of the explorers, traders, and fighters who opened up this new country, and the hardships they faced during their westward expansion into uncharted land along the Santa Fe Trail, which ran from Independence, Missouri, to Santa Fe.

During the 1960s and 1970s, Lavender wrote a series of histories of the American West, including Red Mountain in 1963, Westward Vision: The Story of the Oregon Trail in 1963, The Rockies in 1968 (Harper & Row), and The American West in 1969.

In the 1980s, Lavender expanded his focus as an historian, writing about the Pacific Northwest in Fort Vancouver (1981), Wyoming in Fort Laramie (1984), Utah and Arizona in Colorado River Country (1982) and River Runners of the Grand Canyon (1985), California in California: A Place, a People, a Dream (1986) and California: Land of New Beginnings (1987), and Colorado in The Telluride Story (1987). He also produced general histories of the American West in Overland Migrations (1981), Colorado River Country (1982), The Great West (1985), The Way to the Western Sea (1988), and the American Heritage History of the West (1988).

In 1992, Lavender published Let Me Be Free: The Nez Percé Tragedy (1992), the tragic story of the Nez Percé Indians' flight from their homeland to Canada to escape the United States cavalry. The clash between European-Americans and the American Indians was a subject Lavender covered in many of his previous works.

This goes back to The Big Divide. I always travel to the places I write about, so while I was researching The Big Divide I went to Santa Fé for the first time. I arrived in September, and found myself in the midst of the Fiesta and the burning of Zozobra, old man gloom. That was quite a time. Well, on that trip I got to meet a few Indians. I journeyed to Taos and Acoma Pueblos, and got interested in Canyon de Chelly. This was my first fascination with Indians. There were none around the ranch when I was growing up. That was just the beginning, and my research deepened my fascination.

In the last decade of his life, Lavender focused his writing on the American Southwest. His books De Soto, Coronado, Cabrillo: Explorers of the Northern Mystery (1992), The Santa Fe Trail (1995), Pipe Spring and the Arizona Strip (1997), Mother Earth, Father Sky: Pueblo Indians of the American Southwest (1998), and Climax at Buena Vista: The Decisive Battle of the Mexican-American War (2003) all contributed to documenting the history of the region.

== Honors and awards ==
Lavender was twice nominated for the Pulitzer Prize. He received numerous awards for his work, including awards from American Heritage and the Western Writers of America. He received two Guggenheim Fellowships to study the fur trade, and the Commonwealth Club of California gave him four medals for his histories of Colorado, the Pacific Northwest, early San Francisco, and the Lewis and Clark expedition. In 1997, he received the Wallace Stegner Award from the Center of the American West at the University of Colorado.

== Personal life ==
In the early 1930s, Lavender married Martha Bloom, who gave birth to their only son David G. Lavender in 1934. After his wife died in 1959, he married his second wife, Mildred Moreland, and they remained together for 25 years before she too died. In 1990, on his 80th birthday, Lavender married his third wife, Muriel Sharkey, whom he first got to know on a river trip through the Grand Canyon. In 2003, his health began to fail. Lavender died of natural causes at his home in Ojai, California on April 26, 2003, at the age of 93. He was survived by his wife Muriel, his son David, and numerous grandchildren, stepchildren, and great-grandchildren.

== Works ==
- One Man's West (1943)
- Andy Claybourne (1946)
- The Big Divide: The Lively Story of the People of the Southern Rocky Mountains (1948)
- Snowbound: The Tragic Story of the Donner Party (1948)
- Bent's Fort (1954)
- Trail to Santa Fe (1958)
- Red Mountain (1963)
- Westward Vision: The Story of the Oregon Trail (1963)
- The American West (1969)
- Penguin Book of the American West (1969)
- The Great Persuader: The Biography of Collis P. Huntington (1970)
- California (1972)
- The Rockies (1975)
- Nothing Seemed Impossible: William C. Ralston and Early San Francisco (1975)
- David Lavender's Colorado (1976)
- One Man's West (1977)
- Winner Take All: The Trans-Canada Canoe Trail (1977)
- Land of Giants: Drive to the Pacific Northwest, 1750-1950 (1979)
- The Fist in the Wilderness (1979)
- Overland Migrations: Settlers to Oregon, California, and Utah (1980)
- Los Angeles, Two Hundred (1980)
- Fort Vancouver (1981)
- Overland Migrations (1981)
- Colorado River Country (1982)
- The Southwest (1984)
- Fort Laramie: A Guide to Fort Laramie National Historic Site (1984)
- River Runners of the Grand Canyon (1985)
- The Great West (1985)
- Fort Laramie and the Changing Frontier (1985)
- California: A Place, a People, a Dream (1986)
- California: Land of New Beginnings (1987)
- The Telluride Story (1987)
- The Way to the Western Sea (1988)
- American Heritage History of the West (1988)
- Let Me Be Free: The Nez Perce Tragedy (1992)
- De Soto, Coronado, Cabrillo: Explorers of the Northern Mystery (1992)
- Mask Arts of Mexico (photographer) (1994)
- The Santa Fe Trail (1995)
- Pipe Spring and the Arizona Strip (1997)
- Mother Earth, Father Sky: Pueblo Indians of the American Southwest (1998)
- Fort Vancouver: Fort Vancouver National Historic Site, Washington (2001)
- Climax at Buena Vista: The Decisive Battle of the Mexican-American War (2003)
