= William Brewer (novelist) =

American novelist

William Brewer is an American novelist and poet. He is a Jones Lecturer at Stanford University.

== Bibliography ==
=== Poetry ===
- I Know Your Kind (2017)

=== Novels ===
- The Red Arrow (2022)
