= Margaret Carver Leighton =

American children's author (1896–1987)

- Born: December 20, 1896 Oberlin, Ohio, U.S.
- Died: June 19, 1987 (aged 90) Santa Monica, California, U.S.
- Occupation: Author
- Education: Radcliffe College (BA)
- Genre: Children's literature
- Spouse: James Herbert Leighton (m. 1921; died 1935)
- Children: 4

Margaret Carver Leighton (December 20, 1896 – June 19, 1987) was an American children's author.

== Education ==
Leighton was born in Oberlin, Ohio. She attended schools in Cambridge, Massachusetts; France; and Switzerland while her father was on sabbatical in those countries. She obtained her B.A. degree from Radcliffe College in 1918.

On May 5, 1921, Margaret married James Herbert Leighton. They had four children: James Herbert, Mary, Thomas Carver, and Sylvia. Leighton's husband died in 1935. The family soon moved to California, where she began to write children's books, inspired by her own children's antics.

Her most famous work is Shelley's Mary: A Life of Mary Godwin Shelley, published in 1973.

She was a member of the Westfield, New Jersey, Board of Education from 1930 to 1934, a member of the Santa Monica Public Library Board of Trustees, the Authors League of America, and P.E.N., serving as president at the Los Angeles center from 1957 to 1959.

Margaret Carver Leighton died on June 19, 1987, in Santa Monica, California.

== Works ==
- Junior High School Plays: Ten Short Plays on the American Epic (1938)
- The Secret of the Old House (1941)
- Twelve Bright Trumpets (1942, published in England as The Conqueror, and Other Tales from the Middle Ages )
- The Secret of the Closed Gate (1944)
- The Singing Cave (1945)
- Judith of France (1948)
- The Sword and the Compass: The Far-Flung Adventures of Captain John Smith (1951)
- The Secret of Bucky Moran (1952)
- The Story of Florence Nightingale (1952)
- The Story of General Custer (1954)
- Who Rides By? (1955)
- Comanche of the Seventh (1957)
- The Secret of Smuggler's Cove (1959)
- Journey for a Princess (1960)
- Bride of Glory: The Story of Elizabeth Bacon Custer (1962)
- Voyage to Coromandel (1965)
- The Canyon Castaways (1966)
- A Hole in the Hedge (1968)
- Cleopatra, Sister of the Moon (1969)
- The Other Island (1971)
- Shelley's Mary: A Life of Mary Godwin Shelley (1973)
