= The Singing Cave (Dillon novel) =

1959 novel by Eilís Dillon

- First US edition cover
- Author: Eilís Dillon
- Language: English
- Genre: Young adult fiction
- Set in: Connemara
- Published: 1959 by Faber & Faber
- Publication place: United Kingdom
- Media type: Print
- Pages: 186 pp
- OCLC: 43187026
- Dewey Decimal: 823.914
- LC Class: PZ7.D579

The Singing Cave is a 1959 young adult novel by Irish writer Eilís Dillon, first published by Faber & Faber in the UK. It was published the following year in the US by Funk & Wagnalls, illustrated by Stan Campbell.

== Plot ==
Pat, a boy who lives on the west coast of Ireland at Connemara, explores a niche in a cliff that is known locally as "the singing cave". One day, Pat finds the tomb of a Viking warrior in an inner chamber. When he returns the next day the relics have disappeared, but Pat has told nobody about it but his grandfather and Mr Allen, an amateur archaeologist. Pat and his friend Tom Joyce seek to solve the mystery.

== Reception ==
Declan Kiberd wrote, "What Laura Ingalls Wilder did for children's literature in the US, she achieved in Ireland, imparting a sure historical sense in books such as The Singing Cave.
