= Donald R. Howard =

American academic and author (1927–1987)

Donald Roy Howard (September 18, 1927 – March 2, 1987) was an American academic and author. During the 1950s to 1960s, Howard began his academic career as an instructor and associate professor. From the mid-1960s to mid 1980s, Howard primarily worked as an English professor for Johns Hopkins University and Stanford University. As an author between the 1960s and 1980s, Howard primarily focused his works on Geoffrey Chaucer. During this time period, Howard received a National Endowment for the Humanities fellowship and the Guggenheim Fellowship twice. His posthumously published biography, Chaucer: His Life, His Works, His World, received the 1987 National Book Critics Circle Award in the biography/autobiography category.

== Early life and education ==
On September 18, 1927, Howard was born in St. Louis, Missouri. During his childhood, Howard lived in Swampscott, Massachusetts. For his post-secondary education, Howard first received a Bachelor of Arts from Tufts University in 1950. He later obtained a Master of Arts in 1951 from Rutgers University and a Doctor of Philosophy in 1954 from the University of Florida.

== Career ==
After graduation, Howard worked as an instructor for a year at Florida before joining Ohio State University in 1955. While at Ohio State, he continued his instructor career and was promoted to associate professor before he left the university in 1963. From 1963 to 1966, Howard continued his associate professor experience at the University of California, Riverside. After briefly working at the University of California, Los Angeles for a year, Howard was an English professor at Johns Hopkins University from 1967 until 1977. He then continued his English professorship at Stanford University from 1977 to 1985 before ending his academic career with Stanford in 1987. During his academic career, Howard was the Caroline S. Donvoan Professor of English between 1973 and 1977 and the Olive H. Palmer Professor in the Humanities from 1984 to 1987.

Apart from academics, Howard released The Three Temptations: Medieval Man in Search of the World in 1966 while teaching at California. Focusing on Geoffrey Chaucer, Howard was an editor of a 1969 publication titled The Canterbury Tales: A Selection. For his two books in 1976, Howard revisited The Canterbury Tales before moving on to Troilus and Criseyde and other Chaucer poetry. Four years later, Howard released a sequel to The Idea of the Canterbury Tales titled Writers and Pilgrims: Medieval Pilgrimage Narratives and Their Posterity.

As a biographer, Howard began to write about Chaucer in the late 1970s. For his biography, Howard started writing about Chaucer's writing techniques before focusing on the writing process of The House of Fame, Trolius and Crisyede and The Canterbury Tales during Chaucer's lifetime. Before his death, Howard was told that students would help complete the footnotes of his finished written Chaucer biography while he was in the hospital. Howard's biography, Chaucer: His Life, His Works, His World, was posthumously published in October 1987. Apart from his Chaucer works, Howard was an editor of Sir Gawain and the Green Knight in 1968. He also re-released a publication by Pope Innocent III in 1976 and collaborated on a 1979 work about religious virtues and vices written in Latin. As an essayist, Howard wrote about Dylan Thomas and William Shakespeare.

== Honors and personal life ==
During his career, Howard received fellowships from the Fulbright Program to conduct research in Italy between 1959 and 1960. Howard conducted additional research with an American Council of Learned Societies grant during the 1960s. While specializing in medieval literature, Howard was given his first Guggenheim Fellowship in 1969. In 1970, Howard joined the Medieval Academy of America. From the National Endowment for the Humanities, Howard received a research fellowship in 1977 while at Stanford.

With a second Guggenheim Fellowship in 1984, Howard conducted research for his biography on Chaucer. The following year, Howard was named a Fellow of the Medieval Academy of America. The Poetry Society of America gave Howard the 1977 Melville Cane Award for The Idea of the Canterbury Tales. Posthumously, Howard won the 1987 National Book Critics Circle Award in the biography/autobiography category for Chaucer: His Life, His Works, His World. Howard died on March 2, 1987, from AIDS in San Francisco, California.
