= Jack Hicks =

American sculptor

Harold Jon “Jack” Hicks
- Jack Hicks at Lake Powell Utah
- Born: Harold Jon Hicks; November 18, 1939; Dubuque, Iowa, United States
- Died: March 13, 2008 (aged 68); Salt Lake City, Utah, United States
- Education: University of Arizona in Tucson
- Known for: Drawing, Sculpture, Steel sculpture, Ceramics
- Movement: modern steel constructionist

Harold Jon "Jack" Hicks was a sculptor, who worked in the later part of the twentieth century. He was trained in ceramics and photography but excelled in metal sculpture.

== Biography ==
"Born on November 18, 1939, in Dubuque, Iowa to Helen B. Hogan and Harold G. Hicks. Died on March 13, 2008, in Salt Lake City. As a child, Jack's family moved from Iowa to Tucson, Arizona. There he went on to graduate from Salpointe Catholic High School in May 1958. He proudly entered the Marine Reserves in December 1958, served active duty training from February 5 until August 4, 1959, and finished as a reservist in July 1964. Jack was a masterful artist and craftsman in a multitude of disciplines. He earned a Bachelor of Fine Arts degree from the University of Arizona in Tucson with emphasis in photography and ceramics. He also attained a Master of Fine Arts degree from the University of Utah, in Salt Lake City, with an emphasis in sculpture. All of his later pursuits from the arts of his degree to a fine steel home featured in Architectural Digest; demonstrated his dedication to craftsmanship and minute detail."(Salt Lake City Tribune)

== Museum Display Manager ==
Jack was recruited, by E.F. Sanquenetti, to be the display manager, for the Utah Museum of Fine Arts. He held that position for several years. At the museum, he mentored several young artists. He was legendary, with his skill and craftsmanship. During that period, he was also attending the University of Utah school of Fine Arts Masters Program. Jack often took a common sense approach toward making displays. He sometimes used automotive materials (Bondo) to build stands for stone fragments. He was very pragmatic towards his work and developed methodology for creating fine exhibits. Of note was his aid in creating an installation work for Chris Burden, the performance artist. Chris had wanted to be displayed on a wall in medical tape cocoon. Jack laid out the tape, adhesive side down on the museum floor, and then he carefully pulled it up into a single sheet. He place it on the floor adhesive side up, Chris was lifted into place. Jack then rolled the tape over Chris, the rolled a 1 x 2 into the edge. He then screwed the 1 x 2 into the wall and Chris just hung there for 8 hours. When it was all over Chris thanked Jack and he said that Jack was instrumental in realizing the work. Jack would work on his MFA, after hours, in the museum workshop. His work was in a small room about 10 feet by 20 feet. His entire portfolio was stuffed in the room along with several welding tanks and a 57 Pontiac Front nose and grill. Jack was fairly notorious for pranks in the museum. He would place Ceramic high electrical insulators in display cases showing tang dynasty sang de bœufs (ox blood) red bowls, a baroque picture frame around Frank's Parking spot sign, or questionable photographs in Frank's Slide carousel. He once painted, signage on the loading dock, which said: Loading Dock, "A place where you can get loaded". Frank made him scrub it off. But it could still be seen, for several years, when it rained.

A Number of his works were purchased by the Museum. One is currently on display at the Eccles Medical Library, University of Utah Medical Center. Two others are in the Utah Museum of Fine Arts Collection.

He continued working with "Frank" Sanquenetti, until they had a falling out in the spring of 1976. He quit and began working, as a contractor, building several houses. He continued to mentor several artists, including his daughter Heather. His home became a place of knowledge for the local artists.

== Sculptor ==
Jack was primarily a welded steel sculptor. His work reflected those who had influenced him. Many of his early works were figurative. His later works integrated hard steel forms with welded steel figures. He had a vision of art that was truly unique. Often, he would disassemble his works and rearrange them to suit his mood. Sadly, he would lose interest in them, sell them for ridiculous low prices or even give them away. His formable catalog was reduced to those few pieces he enjoyed having in his environment. His attitude toward art was that it had become pretty things for the rich and he despised the rich. Jack's work was totemic in nature. He used vertical lines to establish height, and then expanded the sculpture horizontally above the viewer. He used cubic planes to define form and break them up the establish a visual rhythm. He used changes in surfaces to make interplay. He used welded steel figures, hung off the sculpture, very much like pacific Native American totems. This continued to be a theme even near his death, where he decorated his grandson's rowboat with a Pacific Native American motif stemhead. He painted his work but would allow them to age. His work was very much contemporary with similar work of the period. The difference was Jack's were better in construction and realized in form. His hallmark was perfect. Not a weld could be found that was poor nor did it look contrived. Jack's work was cross disciplined. The Basis of his master catalog was welded steel forms. He often blurred the lines between art and lifestyle, as he rebuilt his home, into a lovely cottage. The existing workshop, which was made from railroad ties, he covered with found objects. His sense of form and balance could be seen even in the junk he hung by the door of his studio. Jack's belief in original work was great. He once said, to one of his students, "If you don't pick the piece out of the fire with your bare hands, it ain't art." The meaning is art has to be on the ragged edge of your ability, both in style and craftsmanship or you aren't doing art. Jack believed in even breathing art. His world was a vast brush stroke. He taught that and encouraged people to see the world as an artist. He jaded everyone with this attitude towards art. He was an infection of creativity.

Jack is listed in the Smithsonian Institution art inventory catalog

== Partial list of locations of surviving works ==
- Homage to St. Elia #2- Steel and wood. Salt Lake Art Center, Salt Lake City, Utah. See example below
- Untitled, Welded steel with waxed red lacquer finish. Utah Museum of Fine Arts, University of Utah, Salt Lake City, Utah.
- Untitled, Brass, steel, plexiglass & wood. Utah Museum of Fine Arts, University of Utah, Salt Lake City, Utah.
- Untitled, Steel and Aluminum Leaf. Eccles Medical Library, University of Utah Medical Center, Salt Lake City, Utah. see example below
- Prometheus, Steel and found object. Private Collection, Salt Lake City, Utah. see example below
- Untitled, Welded steel Totem. Private Collection, Logan, Utah. see example below

== Boat builder and Volkswagen fanatic ==
Jack was semi retired in the 1990s. He spent his time rebuilding volkswagens, building cabinets, remodeling hair salons and building rowboats. His meaning of retirement was not the same as others. The rowboats were his great interest. He built several for him and his family. Jack's playfulness can be seen in the stemhead of his grandson Will's boat. He attached a rabies tag to the stemhead. In his 60s, he would row his boat for miles at Lake Powell. He was interested in advanced composites and recumbent bicycles. At his death, he was completing a recumbent bicycle for his personal use.

== Author ==
Jack wrote several articles for websites. Most notable his work can be found in the online Duckworks Magazine.

Metal sculpture by Jack Hicks circa 1970

Prometheus by Jack Hicks circa 1970

The entrance of Jack's Studio 2007

11 foot metal sculpture at Eccles Library

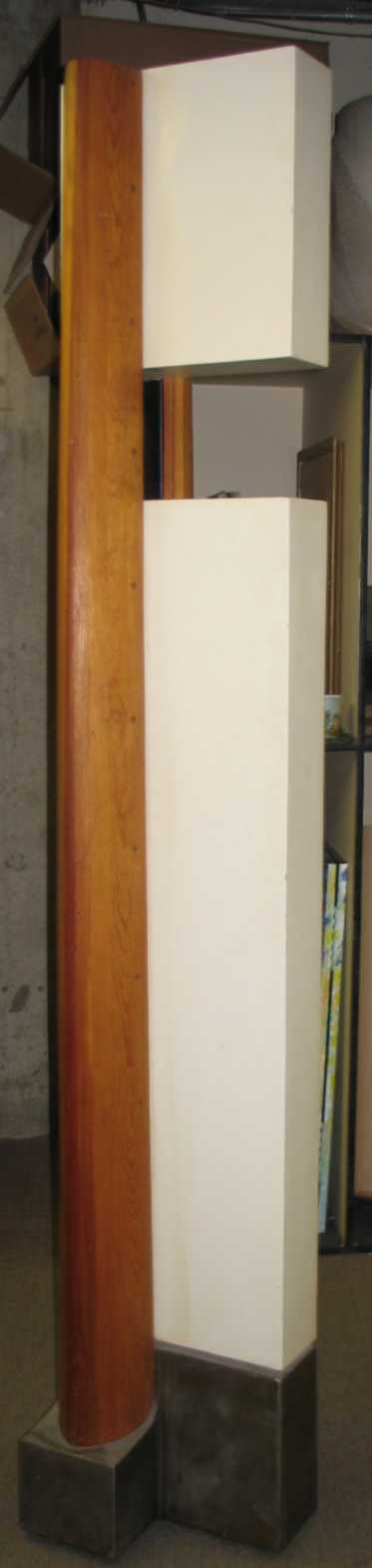
Homage to St Elia #2 by Jack Hicks
