= Enchanted Vagabonds =

Book written by Dana and Ginger Lamb

- Cover of the 2001 Long Riders' Guild Press edition
- Author: Dana and Ginger Lamb
- Language: English
- Genre: Non-fiction
- Publisher: Harper & Bros
- Publication date: 1938
- Publication place: United States
- ISBN: 1-59048-080-5

Enchanted Vagabonds is a book written by Dana and Ginger Lamb, published in 1938. It describes the adventures of an American couple traveling by canoe from North America to Central America. The book details some of their daily routine, adventures and travails, survival methods, dangers and people met. It was one of the best selling non-fiction books of 1938.
