= The Singing Cave (Beames book) =

2009 children's novel by Margaret Beames

- First edition
- Author: Margaret Beames
- Language: English
- Publication date: 2009

The Singing Cave is a 2009 children's book by Margaret Beames. The National Library of New Zealand called it "a well written exciting story by one of New Zealand’s best novelists for children."

== Plot ==
Tom lives on a small tropical island with his parents, who are marine biologists. They rent a home from Ani, whose son Pero is friends with Tom. The play regularly until Pero disappears. The local resident fear Pero has been eaten by a shark, but Tom fears Pero has disappeared in the Singing Cave after Tom refuses to join him there. Tom tells Pero's sister Jojo he is going to the cave. On the cliff above the cave, Tom finds Pero being held by aliens. With the help of a girl named Eleni, they work to rescue Pero.
