= Bram Dijkstra =

Dutch-American academic (born 1938)

- Born: 5 July 1938 (age 88); Indonesia (Dutch East Indies)
- Education: Ph.D. Comparative Literature, University of California, Berkeley
- Occupation: Author · Literary historian · Professor emeritus
- Years active: 1966–2000
- Employer(s): University of California, San Diego (1966–2000)
- Known for: Studies of feminist imagery; WPA‑era art collecting
- Notable work: Idols of Perversity: Fantasies of Feminine Evil in Fin‑de‑Siècle Culture (1986); Evil Sisters: The Threat of Female Sexuality and the Cult of Manhood (1996); Georgia O'Keeffe and the Eros of Place (1998); American Expressionism: Art and Social Change 1920–1950 (2003); Naked: The Nude in America (2010)
- Title: Professor Emeritus, Department of Literature, UC San Diego
- Spouse: Sandra Dijkstra

Bram Dijkstra (born Abraham Dijkstra on 5 July 1938) is an American author, literary critic and former professor of English literature. Dijkstra wrote seven books on various literary and artistic subjects concerning writing. He also curates art exhibitions and writes catalog essays for San Diego art museums.

== Early life and education ==
Dijkstra was born on a small island in Indonesia but spent his formative years in the Netherlands. His father had been interned in a Japanese concentration camp and died soon after World War II. Dijkstra later moved to the United States, where he attended San Diego State University. After completing his undergraduate studies, Dijkstra earned his Ph.D. in Comparative Literature from the University of California, Berkeley.

== Career ==
He joined the faculty of the University of California, San Diego in 1966 and taught there until he retired and became an emeritus professor in 2000. He has written seven books including Idols of Perversity: Fantasies of Feminine Evil in Fin-de-siècle Culture (1986) and Evil Sisters: The Threat of Female Sexuality and the Cult of Manhood (1996).

== Personal life ==
Dijkstra is married to literary agent Sandra Dijkstra. He lives in Del Mar, California.

== Art and music collecting ==
Dijkstra and his wife, Sandra Dijkstra, have collected art, books, and music. In 2023, they donated a collection of Black music materials to Stanford University.

The Dijkstras also donated a collection of rare pulp magazines to San Diego State University. In addition, they donated artworks to the Huntington Library.

== Publications ==
- Faces in Skin: Poems and Drawings (Oyez, 1965)
- Hieroglyphics of a New Speech: Cubism, Stieglitz and the Early Poetry of William Carlos Williams (Princeton University Press, 1970)
- Idols of Perversity: Fantasies of Feminine Evil in Fin-de-siècle Culture (Oxford University Press, 1986)
- Evil Sisters: The Threat of Female Sexuality and the Cult of Manhood (Knopf, 1996)
- Georgia O'Keeffe and the Eros of Place (Princeton University Press, 1998)
- American Expressionism: Art and Social Change 1920–1950 (Harry N. Abrams, 2003)
- Naked: The Nude in America (Rizzoli, 2010)
