= David R. Wallace =

American mathematician and inventor (1942–2012)

David R. Wallace (December 15, 1942 – March 2, 2012) was an American mathematician and inventor. He is known for the Wallace algorithm as well as “Software Cloaking”, a patented method for hiding the internal operations of computer programs.

== Education and professional career ==
Wallace received degrees in mathematics from Columbia University (BA), University of California at Berkeley (MA) and a Ph.D. in 1975 at Tulane University with his dissertation Permutation Groupoids and Circuit Bases: An Algebraic Resolution of Some Graph Structures.

He was a professor at Emory University, DePauw and Boston University. He was Chief Software Architect for Alliant, Chief compiler architect at Sun Microsystems, and co-founder of Determina (now part of VMware).

== Inventions ==
Wallace was the inventor of the Wallace algorithm, a method for determining the dependence between array references in scientific programs for the purpose of parallelization.

He was also the inventor of “Software Cloaking”, a technology for preventing reverse engineering. This process is primarily used to prevent hackers from cracking DRM systems. Cloaking hides the internal operation of a program using mathematical transformations. His patent for this technology, “System and Method for Cloaking Software,” was granted by the USPTO in February 2001.

David R. Wallace had several patents pending for a new form of software security called "Greencastle Vulnerability Shield".
