= Irene D. Paden =

American historian (1888–1974)

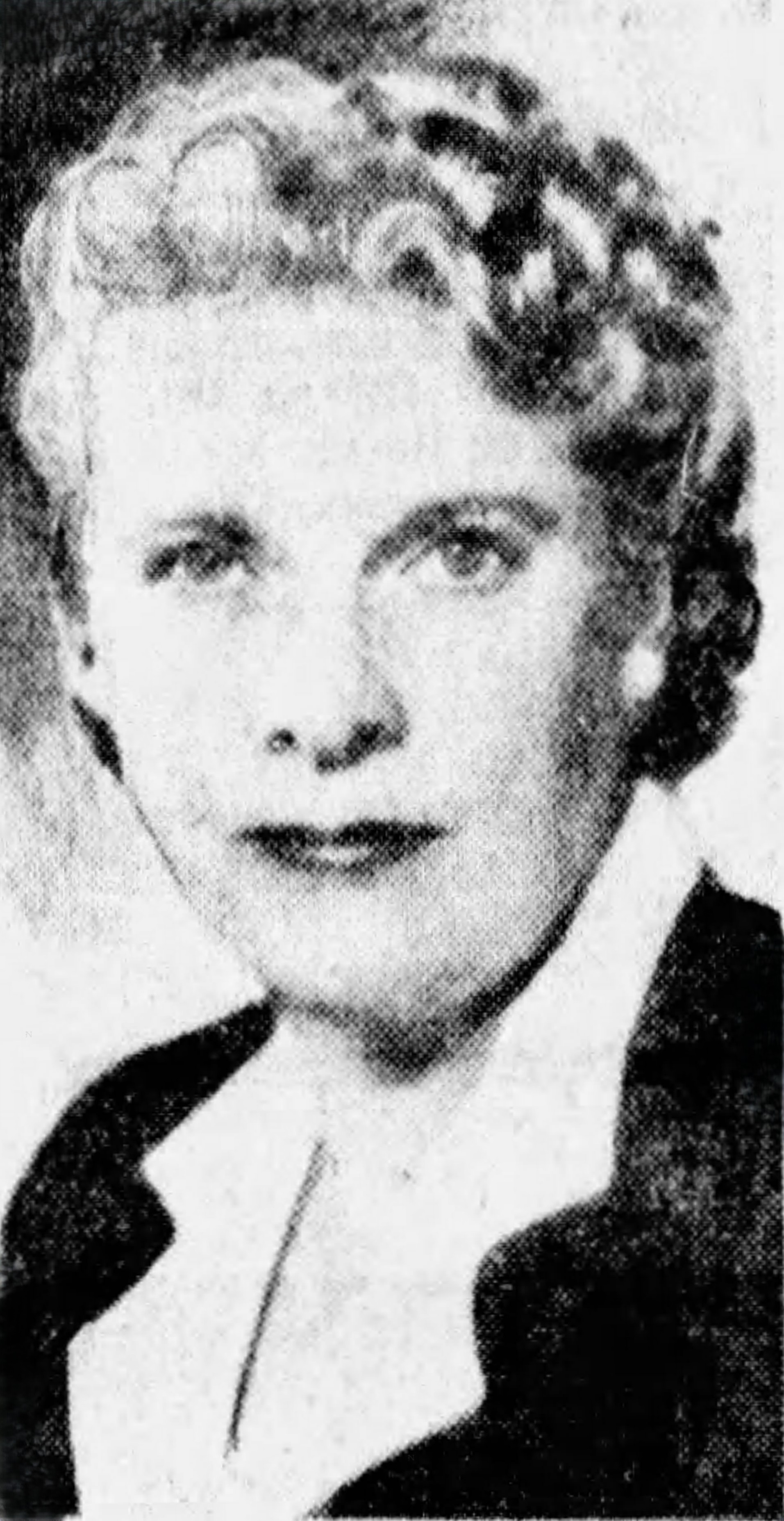
- Paden in 1943
- Born: Adelaide Irene Dakin; October 30, 1888; Santa Cruz, California, U.S.
- Died: August 5, 1974 (aged 85); Oakland, California, U.S.
- Occupation: Historian
- Spouse: William Guy Paden (m. 1908; died 1954)
- Awards: Guggenheim Fellowship (1955)

Academic work
- Sub-discipline: Westward expansion trails

Adelaide Irene Dakin Paden (October 30, 1888 – August 5, 1974) was an American historian who researched westward expansion trails. She wrote three books – The Wake of the Prairie Schooner (1943), Prairie Schooner Detours (1949), and The Big Oak Flat Road to Yosemite (1959) – and was awarded a Guggenheim Fellowship in 1955.

== Biography ==
Adelaide Irene Dakin was born on October 30, 1888, in Santa Cruz, California. She was the daughter of Irene Ruby (née Hill) and Wilbur Jameson Dakin, a ranch manager in Pleasanton, California. She married William Guy Paden in Pleasanton on June 15, 1908, and they later had one son; her husband worked as superintendent of schools for Alameda, California. She self-identified as a "housewife", and they remained married until his death on April 6, 1954.

In the 1920s, she and Herbert Eugene Bolton researched what became the Juan Bautista de Anza National Historic Trail. In 1932, when her husband needed to work on his doctoral thesis, she began following the California Trail and Oregon Trail as part of an annual summer trip with her husband and son, continuing until 1940. In 1943, she published The Wake of the Prairie Schooner, based on field work involving these trips; it marked Paden's debut as a writer. Paden also did illustrations for the book. In 1949, she wrote another book on Overland Trail routes, Prairie Schooner Detours. Through various methods such as horseback or vehicular transportation, she and her husband spent decades retracing the routes of the westward expansion trails all the way to Missouri.

In 1948, she published an edited diary, The Journal of Madison Berryman Moorman, 1850-1851. In 1955, she was awarded a Guggenheim Fellowship for "historical and bibliographical studies of the exploration and settlement of Oregon and California". She and Margaret E. Schlichtmann co-authored The Big Oak Flat Road to Yosemite (1959), which focuses on the California State Route 120 section of the same name; Paden herself wrote the book based on Schlichtmann's notes.

She was part of the Council of Friends of the Bancroft Library from 1949 until 1953.

Paden died on August 5, 1974, in Oakland, California.

== Bibliography ==
- The Wake of the Prairie Schooner (1943)
- Prairie Schooner Detours (1949)
- (as editor) The Journal of Madison Berryman Moorman, 1850-1851 (1948)
- The Big Oak Flat Road to Yosemite (1959)
