= Tracy's Tiger =

1951 novel by William Saroyan

- First edition
- Author: William Saroyan
- Language: English
- Publication date: 1951

Tracy's Tiger is a short novel by William Saroyan. It was first published in 1951 by Doubleday, illustrated with drawings by Henry Koerner. It appears in the short story collection "The William Saroyan Reader," first edition 1958, published by George Braziller, Inc.

The story of Tracy's Tiger was adapted into an original musical in two acts for the Oregon Shakespeare Festival's 2007 season. This world-premiere production, with books and lyrics by Linda Alper, Douglas Langworthy and Penny Metropulos and music and additional lyrics by Sterling Tinsley, was directed by Penny Metropolus. Produced in the New Theatre, the smallest of Oregon Shakespeare Festival's theaters, the musical met with a warm reception from critics and played to sold-out audiences for the entire season.

The Saroyan story was transplanted from New York to 1950s San Francisco for the musical. Twentysomething Tracy, whose jivey tiger is invisible to all but him (and the audience), falls instantly for Laura, who has her own invisible and very seductive tigress. But on his first visit to Laura's home, Tracy makes a possibly irremediable mistake. The tiger becomes visible and is hunted down on the streets of San Francisco by a compassionate police officer, under the orders of his bumbling chief. The moving finale is a scene of redemption and reincarnation of characters not seen since Act 1.

Tinsley, who also played the piano in this production, worked in a wide range of musical genres, matching the genre to the character.
