= John Espey =

American novelist

John Jenkins Espey (15 January 1913 – 26 September 2000) was a novelist, memoirist and literary scholar, born in Shanghai where his parents were Presbyterian missionaries. Espey returned to the United States to study at Occidental College in 1930, then went to Merton College, Oxford, as a Rhodes Scholar in 1935. In 1938, he became a member of the faculty at his alma mater, then taught in the English Department at UCLA from 1948 until his death.

== Childhood ==
He grew up in China, but learned French instead of Chinese, and according to book reviewer Steve Bradbury, apparently did not have Chinese friends who were especially close.

== Career ==
Espey described the world of his Shanghai childhood in a series of humorous though sometime rueful sketches in The New Yorker magazine which he collected into several books. Minor Heresies (New York: Knopf, 1945) and Tales Out of School (New York: Knopf, 1947) described life and education at the Kuling American School and his experiences as a member of the Pine Tree Patrol, a Boy Scout troop, and were followed by The Other City (New York: Knopf, 1950). These memoirs of missionary life in pre-revolutionary Shanghai were both affectionate and skeptical in their descriptions of an earnest Presbyterian effort to uplift China, and the resistance of local society to those efforts. Selections from these books were included in Minor Heresies, Major Departures (Berkeley: University of California Press, 1994), which collects "all that he wishes to retain" of these writings. He waited until well after the death of his parents to write longer and franker treatments – Strong Drink, Strong Language (1990), a nonfiction book which was nominated for the National Book Critics Circle Award, and the novel Winter Return (1992). "I loved this man," he recalled to the Los Angeles Times, but when he visited his father in a Pasadena retirement home, he needed the fortification of whiskey. "I felt greatly hurt that, even at the end of his life, we didn't communicate. He felt that my work was frivolous. I really should have been out there converting souls."

Espey's fiction includes two "California" novels: The Anniversaries (1963) and An Observer (1965). His literary scholarship includes the early monograph Ezra Pound's "Mauberley": A Study in Composition (London: Faber & Faber, 1955; Berkeley: University of California Press, 1974), and, with Richard Ellmann, Oscar Wilde: Two Approaches (1977). He also collected decorative bookbinding and with his friend Charles Gullans compiled bibliographies on the subject: A Checklist of Trade Bindings Designed by Margaret Armstrong (1968) and The Decorative Designers (1970).

== Personal life ==
In 1938, John married Alice Martha Rideout, whom he met as an undergraduate. They had two daughters, Alice and Susan. A year after his wife's death in 1974, he began a literary and personal relationship with Carolyn See, who had been one of his graduate students, which lasted the rest of his life. They wrote of their relationship in Two Schools of Thought: Some Tales of Learning and Romance (1991). Under the pseudonym "Monica Highland," Espey, See, and Carolyn's daughter, Lisa See wrote three popular novels: Lotus Land (1983), 110 Shanghai Road (1986), and Greetings from Southern California (1988).

== See also ==
- Decorative Designers
