= Geraldine Knatz =

American maritime expert, academic and author

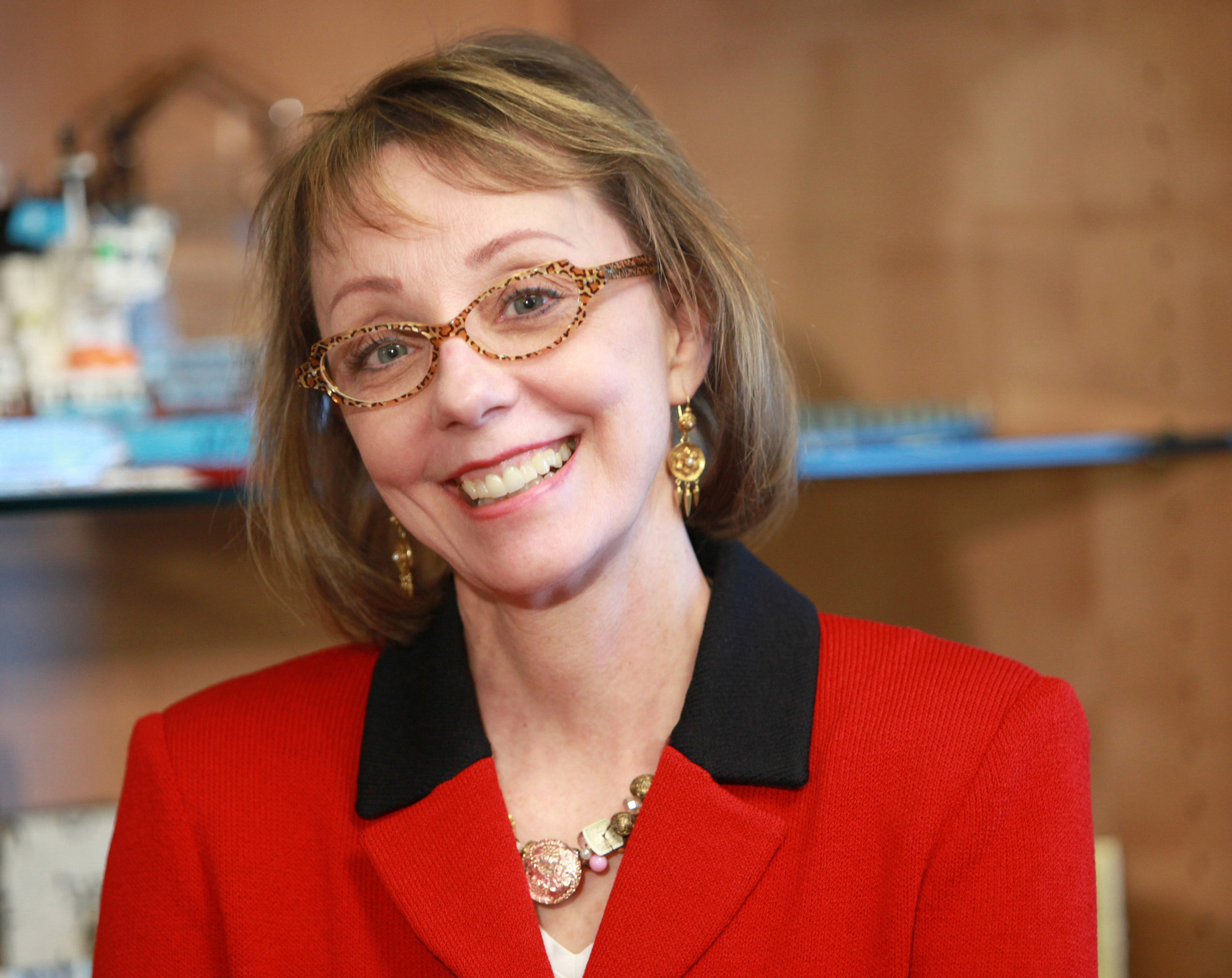
- Knatz in April 2012
- Born: October 18, 1951 (age 74); New Jersey, United States
- Occupations: Port Director, Port of Los Angeles, Maritime expert, academic, and an author
- Awards: Lifetime Achievement Award, Containerization and Intermodal Institute

Academic background
- Education: B.Sc., M.Sc., and Ph.D.
- Alma mater: Rutgers University; University of Southern California

Geraldine Knatz (born October 18, 1951) is a maritime expert, academic, and author. She was the first female port director of the Port of Los Angeles, appointed in January 2006 by Los Angeles Mayor Antonio Villaraigosa. As Los Angeles port director she formulated and implemented the Clean Truck Program, and the San Pedro Bay Ports Clean Air Action Plan. She is a professor of Practice at the University of Southern California, with a joint appointment to the USC Viterbi School of Engineering and the USC Price School of Public Policy.

In 2014, in recognition of "her international leadership in the development of environmentally sustainable urban ports", she was elected to the National Academy of Engineering. She is Chair of the board of trustees of AltaSea at the Port of Los Angeles, and has been serving as a senior advisor to Asia-Pacific Economic Cooperation (APEC) Port Services Network. Several writers have featured her maritime career in their books, including Edward Humes’s Door to Door, Bill Sharpsteen's The Docks, and The Golden Shore by David Helvarg. Her research interests span environmental sustainability in port operations, and global port governance.

Knatz is past president of the American Association of Port Authorities and the International Association of Ports and Harbors, and founding Chairman of the World Port Climate Initiative. She played a leading role in a National Geographic T.V. Show, America’s Port. The eight-episode series ran in 2008. She is the author of three books, Long Beach's Los Cerritos, Port of Los Angeles: Conflict, Commerce, and the Fight for Control, and Terminal Island, Lost Communities of Los Angeles Harbor. California Governor Arnold Schwarzenegger appointed Knatz to the California Ocean Protection Council in 2007. Governor Jerry Brown reappointed her to the Council in 2012.

She has been a Fellow of Linnean Society of London since 2012. Her non-profit board appointments include the Banning Museum based in Wilmington California, and the Los Angeles Historical Society. In 2023, she joined the Catalina Island Conservancy. In 2024, she became the Chair of the Grand Jury to select the Antoine Rufenacht Prize, a global prize awarded by the Association of Port Cities.

The Geraldine Knatz papers can be found on the University of Southern California Archives.

== Personal life ==
Knatz married John C. Mulvey in August 1987, and has two children.

== Education ==
Knatz graduated with a B.Sc. in zoology from Rutgers University in 1973. She received M.Sc. in Environmental Engineering in 1977 and Ph.D. in Biological Sciences in 1979 from the University of Southern California. She completed the Global Logistics Professional (GLP) program at California State University, Long Beach at Long Beach in 2000.

== Career ==
Knatz began working as a Marine Environmental Specialist at the Port of Los Angeles. In 1981, she moved to head the environmental office at the Port of Long Beach. She served as the Director of Planning for the Port of Long Beach from 1988 to 1999 and was promoted to the position of managing director in 1999. Subsequently, she served as the executive director at the Port of Los Angeles from 2006 to 2014. She was the first woman to be appointed Chief Executive of the Port of Los Angeles. She made a significant impact on the port region through the development and implementation of the first San Pedro Bay Ports Clean Air Action Plan (CAAP), and the Clean Truck Program. The clean truck program banned non-compliant trucks from access to the port, a right that she helped in defending in the U.S. Supreme Court.

Knatz started her academic career as an instructor of Environmental Engineering at University of Southern California in 1981. She concurrently held an appointment as an adjunct professor in the Center for Public Policy at the California State University, and American Military University between 1985 and 2004. As of 2014, she is a professor of the Practice of Engineering and Policy at the University of Southern California.

== Research ==
Knatz has authored numerous publications including scholarly journals, book chapters, and books and her research works span seaport policy and management with respect to environmentalism, maritime transportation, and seaport sustainability.

Her research at USC has focused on the drivers and implication of the automation of port container terminals.

=== Port planning and governance ===
Knatz has researched the various aspects of port planning, practices, governance and the seaport practices of United States. She explored how the competition among ports in the United States influenced change in port governance, strategic decision-making, and governmental policy. With a team of academics, she has addressed the types of port cooperation and integration, and provided an insight into its dynamics including examining the influence of political, institutional, and commercial factors. Public policy, political, financial factors were determined as leading drivers of port cooperation. The study also highlighted how regionalism may affect the port-cooperation.

Regarding national port planning, Knatz proposed a systemwide analysis of the capacity of U.S. ports from a capacity deficit lens rather than a capacity surplus one as it can determine the elasticities in the port system.

Knatz also examined nearly a century of attempts to merge the Ports of Los Angeles and Long Beach. The primary reasons for the failure of merger proposals for Los Angeles and Long Beach were that proposing parties were usually business groups, and officials who were not part of port administration. It was also revealed that merger proposals lacked an objective analysis that addressed the potential benefits aimed at both ports.

=== Seaport sustainability ===
Knatz has focused research works on seaport growth from the perspectives of environmentalism, sustainability, and economic development. She regarded the Port of Los Angeles Clean Air Action Plan as a turning point for the port and maritime industries. In order to rebuild a sustainable relationship between a port with its neighbors for economic development, she proposed a strategy focused on co-locating and establishing partnerships between technology developers, academic researchers, and the marine and maritime businesses by incorporating aspects of the traditional cluster model. This concept led to the development of Alta Sea at the Port of Los Angeles.

=== Popular authored works ===
James Tejani in his book review of, Port of Los Angeles: Conflict, Commerce, and the Fight for Control emphasized Knatz's expertise, "Who could possibly know the Port of Los Angeles better than Geraldine Knatz...each page...radiates Knatz's familiarity and personal bond with the harbor's past, present, and future." Donna Littlejohn, a reporter for Daily Breeze assessed that the book highlights the evolution of port growth in the 20th century from the early tough years to globalization. She regarded Knatz a good pick for telling the port's story based on her extensive personal experience on the port, and added, "The story had plenty of drama and mystery to it...while not a trained historian, Knatz was well-suited for the task." In addition to that, Littlejohn reported that, “book looks at the evolution of commission members, who early on were largely local business owners. Through today’s lens, conflict of interest issues loomed large.”

Stas Margaronis reviewed Terminal Island: Lost Communities of Los Angeles Harbor in 2015 and was of the view that the authors, "take us back to the 1900’s when Terminal Island was a vacation resort and Bohemian colony" when "artists mingled with writers, military men exchanged ideas with scientists…" David L. Ulin, a columnist at Los Angeles Times commented that it is a "story marked by deep layers, contradictions, a story we don’t often like to tell ourselves." He also praised the meticulousness of authors, "Hirahara and Knatz are smart and detailed on this early history, framing the development of Terminal Island through the filter of the growth of Los Angeles itself. However, the idyllic era ended at the time of attack on Pearl Harbor by Japanese military strike, and the Japanese-American community had to lose their freedom, and livelihood." Ulin stated, "this is a brutal and disgusting chapter of American history goes without saying, and yet, Hirahara and Knatz treat it in a sober way. Their lack of overt emotion only gives more power to the telling, letting events and policies speak for themselves."

== Awards and honors ==
- 2007 – Outstanding Women in Transportation, Journal of Commerce
- 2007 – Woman Executive of the Year, Los Angeles Business Journal
- 2008 – Compass Award, Women's Leadership Exchange West Coast Summit
- 2009 – Leadership Award, National Association of Women Business Owners-Los Angeles (NAWBO-LA)
- 2012 – Mujer Maritima (Maritime Woman) Award, Regional Hispanic Chamber of Commerce
- 2012 – Peter Benchley Ocean Award for “Excellence in Solutions”, Blue Frontier Campaign
- 2012 – Special Award in Historical Preservation, Los Angeles City Historical Society
- 2013 – Alumni Award, Sonny Astani Department of Civil and Environmental Engineering
- 2013 – Alumni Merit Award, University of Southern California
- 2014 – Lifetime Achievement Award, Containerization and Intermodal Institute
- 2022 – Woman of Distinction, California Assembly District 70

== Bibliography ==
=== Books ===
- Port of Los Angeles: Conflict, Commerce, and the Fight for Control (2019) ISBN 978-1-62640-071-9
- Terminal Island: Lost Communities of Los Angeles Harbor (2015) ISBN 978-1-62640-018-4
- Long Beach's Los Cerritos (2014) ISBN 9781467131292

=== Selected Articles ===
- Dawson, J. K., & Knatz, G. (1980). Illustrated key to the planktonic copepods of San Pedro Bay, California. California: Allan Hancock Foundation.
- Knatz, G. (2006). National port planning: A different perspective. Transportation research record, 1963(1), 52–55.
- Knatz, G. (2013). Looking beyond cargo and cruise ships: Promoting academic marine research and clean technologies as an economic development strategy for ports. Coastal Management, 41(4), 314–326.
- Knatz, G. (2016). Early Women Scientists of Los Angeles Harbor. Bulletin, Southern California Academy of Sciences, 115(2), 98–111.
- Knatz, G. (2017). How competition is driving change in port governance, strategic decision-making and government policy in the United States. Research in Transportation Business & Management, 22, 67–77.
- Notteboom, T., Knatz, G., & Parola, F. (2018). Port co-operation: types, drivers and impediments. Research in Transportation Business and Management, 26, 1–4.
- Knatz, G. (2018). Port mergers: Why not Los Angeles and Long Beach?. Research in transportation business & management, 26, 26–33.
- Knatz, G., Notteboom, T., & Pallis, A. A. (2022). Container Terminal Automation: revealing distinctive terminal characteristics and operating parameters. Maritime Economics & Logistics, 24(3), 537–565.
- Knatz, G. Notteboom, T. and Pallis, A. (2024) Container Terminal Automation: assessment of drivers and benefits. Maritime Policy & Management 51(6), 1252-1276.
