= Vikram Sethi =

American author and cyber security specialist

- Education: University of Pittsburgh (PhD); Wright State University (MBA)
- Occupations: Author, cybersecurity scholar, supply chain domain expert
- Years active: 1992 - Present
- Employer(s): Raj Soin College of Business, WSU; Institute of Defense Studies and Education, WSU; Center for Professional Education, WSU; Data Intensive Supply Chain Research Center, WSU
- Known for: cybersecurity
- Website: drvikramsethi.com

Vikram Sethi is an American author and cyber security specialist. He is a professor of information systems and supply chain management and former director of the Institute of Defense Studies and Education at Wright State University. He also served as an advisor to the dean.

== Career ==
Sethi began his teaching career as an assistant professor at Southwest Missouri State University (renamed Missouri State University, Springfield, MO). He later became associate professor and PhD coordinator at the College of Business, University of Texas at Arlington between 1999 and 2003. He joined the Raj Soin College of Business at Wright State University in 2003 as a department chair and professor of information systems and operations management. In 2006, he founded the Institute of Defense Studies and Education at Wright State University and served as its director until 2017. The institute supports the US Department of Defense, commercial industry and others by employing experts from government, the military, academia and the private sector. In October 2011, the institute hired retired US Air Force commander, Major General

Sethi also served as Director, Data Intensive Supply Chain Research Center of the University, whose focus is on supply chains that are strongly supported by information technology and data, including RFID. Additionally, he manages the university's supply chain program which offers certifications in nine subject areas.

Sethi also set up Wright State University’s Center of Professional Education in 2007 and serves as its director.

== Publications ==
Sethi has written several books on cybercrime and organizational transformation, and published more than 50 articles in peer-reviewed journals. He continues to call for the establishment of a global cyber regime capable of mitigating the growing risks of cyber war and manage the cyber polity of diverse nations. In his book, Weapons of Mass Psychological Destruction and the People Who Use Them, he discusses the shift from kinetic war to cyber war using numerous case studies. He writes, “cyber war is already upon us,” adding that nothing short of a robust, multinational, cyber regime can change its long-term direction. He has also highlighted the extreme vulnerability of small and medium businesses, especially in the Dayton area, to cyber attacks. More recently, he underscored the growing threat from readymade ransomware available on the dark web Dr. Sethi believes that with strategic planning, investment in cutting-edge technology, and strong public-private partnerships, modern nation-states can fortify their defenses against ever-evolving cyber threats. He has also drawn attention to how seemingly innocuous devices and older technologies, such as pagers, for instance, can turn into lethal weapons and what this means for the future of supply chain security.

== Books ==
- Sethi, Vikram (2020). Cyber Fear, Trauma, and Psychosis: A Book of Case Studies (upcoming release)
- Sethi, Vikram (2020). Cyber Weapons of Mass Psychological Destruction: And the People Who Use Them, Greylander Press, LLC.ISBN 978-1-7348188-9-5
- Sethi, Vikram (2015). Weapons of Mass Psychological Destruction and the People Who Use Them (Practical and Applied Psychology. Praeger Publishing. ISBN 978-1440837548
- Sethi, Vikram (1998). Organizational Transformation Through Business Process Reengineering: Applying Lessons Learned. Pearson College Division.ISBN 9788177585186
