= The Singing Cave (Leighton novel) =

First edition

The Singing Cave is a children's novel by Margaret Carver Leighton and illustrated by Manning de V. Lee. It was published in 1945 by Houghton Mifflin. It first appeared as a serial in the Christian Science Monitor in summer 1944.

== Plot summary ==
Southern California ranch boy Billy Deane dreads the arrival of Penny, a visitor from New York. Eventually, he befriends her, and they search for artifacts around the area with their Native American friend Felipe. They encounter smugglers and the mystery of the singing cave, and they discover rare artifacts. Eventually, they find the Singing Cave and discover its mystery.

== Reception ==
The book was well received by critics. Virginia Kirkus found it "a fast-moving and well-written story," while May Lamberton Becker praised it for "combining attractions of a mystery with those of a ranch story."
