= Dana and Ginger Lamb =

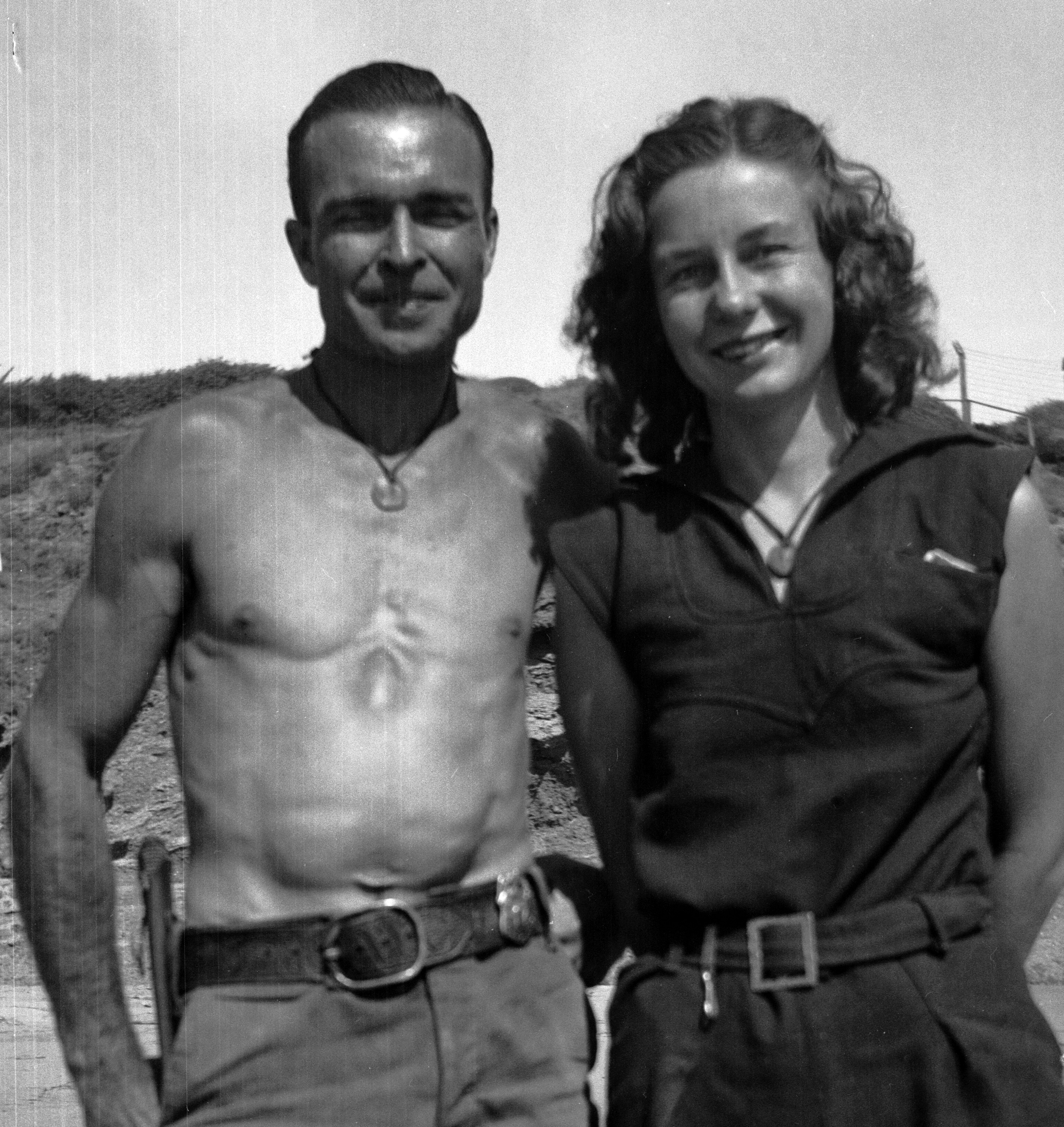
Dana (left) and Ginger Lamb, 1933

Dana and Virginia Lamb were American travel writers.

Dana Upton Lamb was born in Tustin, California, on January 18, 1901, to John Charles Lamb and Emma Mary Holderman Lamb. J. C. Lamb served as the Orange County Tax Collector for thirty-three years and also raised groves of oranges, lemons and avocados. A 1923 graduate of Santa Ana High School, Dana joined the crews of the steamer W. M. Irish and the S. S. Carenco, traveling to the Eastern United States and Morocco, Egypt, Greece, Italy, Cyprus and Syria in 1924–1925. Active in the Boy Scouts at an early age, Dana Lamb served as field executive for the Orange County Council and as assistant scout executive, Greater Providence Council, Rhode Island, from 1926 to 1927. He also served as chief of the Laguna Beach lifeguard service, which likely provided him with the training and expertise to begin the Orange County Coast Patrol in the late 1930s.

Virginia Marshall Bishop (later Ginger Lamb) was born in Santa Ana, CA, to watchmaker-optometrist Vernon M. Bishop and Nancy Cutler Bishop on September 22, 1912. The family moved to El Centro, California, shortly following Ginger's birth but returned to Santa Ana sometime around 1921. She graduated from Santa Ana High School in 1930.

Dana and Ginger married February 19, 1933. In August, they embarked on what became a three-year, 16,000 mile voyage in their homemade, sixteen-foot canoe, the Vagabunda, from Southern California down the Pacific coasts of Mexico, Guatemala, and Costa Rica, and culminated in their crossing of the Panama Canal in September 1936. They chronicled their adventures in a book, Enchanted Vagabonds (1938), and went on the lecture circuit to capitalize on the great public interest in their journey and lives as adventurers. They continued their travels in Mexico and Central America during the 1940s, during which time they did some research for the Federal Government as special agents and produced a substantial report titled Report on Mexico in 1943. Their second book, Quest for the Lost City (1951), detailed their continued adventures in the 1940s and was the basis for a feature-length film of the same name produced by Sol Lesser and released by RKO Pictures in 1954. The Lambs visited several known Maya sites in the area, including Bonampak, Palenque and Yaxchilan during their "quest". The Lambs also spent time with the Lacandon Maya of eastern Chiapas. More controversially, the Lambs claim to have discovered their "lost city", which they named "Lashch-Tu-Nich", meaning "place of carved stones" in the Mayan language. Several of the photographs in the book depict the Lambs standing with overgrown ruins. These ruins have never been identified. A Mayan site named Laxtunich is known to have been a subsidiary site of Yaxchilan, in Chiapas, and has possibly been identified as the archaeological site at Tecolote, though it is of course unknown whether this is the site the Lambs visited. Most professional archaeologists and fellow explorers discount the Lambs' story of the Lost City and the "Golden Books of the Maya" as being largely fabricated.

Having made the seaside village of Corona del Mar their home base during their years of adventure travel, the growing population explosion in Orange County in the postwar era prompted the Lambs to move to the former mining town of Hillsboro, in the southwestern mountains of New Mexico, in 1962. The Lambs continued to camp and explore Baja California and deliver the occasional lecture, until Ginger Lamb died on February 25, 1967. The ensuing years for Dana Lamb were not idle, as he had to deal with the ramifications of a disastrous flood in Hillsboro in September 1972 and traveled to Micronesia in 1975-1976 before his death on June 11, 1979.

A large collection of the Lamb's writings, artifacts, movies, photos, etc. has been amassed at The Sherman Library in Corona Del Mar, California (http://www.slgardens.org/)

The canoe (Vagabunda) used in their Enchanted Vagabonds adventures is on display in the lobby of the Adventurers' Club of Los Angeles (https://web.archive.org/web/20100211113512/http://www.adventurersclub.org/About.htm.)

Chronology of the Lives of Dana and Ginger Lamb

1901 January 18 Dana Upton Lamb born in Tustin, CA, to John Charles Lamb and Emma Holderman Lamb

1912 September 22 Virginia Marshall Bishop born in Santa Ana, CA, to Vernon M. Bishop and Nan Cutler Bishop

1926-1927 Dana Lamb serves as assistant scout executive, Greater Providence Council, Rhode Island

1929 December 28 Dana Lamb marries Ethel Catherine Stuart, Yuma Co., AZ

1931 August 20 Separation of Dana Lamb and Ethel Catherine Stuart Lamb

1933 February 10 Divorce of Dana Lamb and Ethel Catherine Stuart Lamb

1933 February 19 Dana Lamb and Virginia "Ginger" Marshall Bishop marry

1933 August Voyage of the Vagabunda begins

1936 September End of the voyage of the Vagabunda

1938 Harper & Brothers publishes Enchanted Vagabonds

1940 Dana and Ginger Lamb begin their Quest

1951 Harper & Brothers publishes Quest for the Lost City

1954 December Sol Lesser's production of Quest for the Lost City previews

1961 Dana Lamb travels on Amazon River with Romain Wilhelmsen and Herman Jesson

1962 Dana and Ginger Lamb move to Hillsboro, NM 5

1967 February 25 Ginger Lamb dies

1972 April 14 Dana Lamb marries Becky Taylor

1972 September 2 Hillsboro, NM experiences devastating flood

1972 Divorce of Dana Lamb and Becky Taylor Lamb

1975 Dana Lamb meets Maria Fellin

1975-1976 Micronesia trip

1979 June 11 Dana Lamb dies

== Works ==
- Enchanted Vagabonds, New York, London, Harper & Bros., 1938. ISBN 1-59048-080-5
- Quest for the Lost City. ISBN 1-59048-079-1
