= Sunset High School =

Sunset High School is the name of several high schools in the United States:

- Sunset High School (Crescent City, California)
- Sunset High School (Encinitas, California)
- Sunset High School (Hayward, California)
- Sunset High School (Sunset, Louisiana), listed on the National Register of Historic Places
- Sunset High School (Las Vegas, Nevada)
- Sunset High School (Beaverton, Oregon)
- Sunset High School (Dallas, Texas)
- Sunset High School (El Paso, Texas), former high school in the El Paso Independent School District
- Sunset High School (San Antonio, Texas)

== See also ==
- Miami Sunset High School, Miami, Florida
- Royal Sunset High School, Hayward, California
