= The Fifth Book of Peace =

2003 book by Maxine Hong Kingston

- Author: Maxine Hong Kingston
- Publisher: Knopf
- Publication date: September 2, 2003
- Pages: 416
- ISBN: 978-0679440758
- Preceded by: To Be the Poet
- Followed by: Veterans of War, Veterans of Peace

The Fifth Book of Peace is a 2003 book by Maxine Hong Kingston, published by Knopf. Part-fiction, part-memoir, the book was written in response to Kingston's house fire in 1991 and additionally contains her thoughts about war, specifically the Vietnam War and the Gulf War, among others.

== Contents and background ==
In September of 1991, Kingston attended her father’s funeral. Afterward, she returned to Oakland, California only to discover that her neighborhood and house were on fire. At the time, Kingston had been writing the manuscript for The Fourth Book of Peace, a sequel to Tripmaster Monkey: His Fake Book, but it, along with many of Kingston’s other possessions, didn’t survive. In the end, the fire killed 25 people.

In The Fifth Book of Peace, Kingston partially rewrites the lost sequel, following her protagonist Wittman Ah Sing’s adventures in Hawaii, while also elaborating on her own personal experiences with regard to the fire and her meditations on war past and present, specifically the Vietnam War. The book, in its final section, also concerns Kingston’s experiences teaching writing workshops to veterans, a practice she began inspired by Thich Nhat Hanh after her house fire; over 200 veterans have taken part since. The book also involves the experiences of those who were arrested alongside Kingston during a demonstration against the Iraq War outside of the White House in 2003.

== Critical reception ==
Publishers Weekly wrote: “Kingston writes in a panoply of languages: American, Chinese, poetry, dreams, mythos, song, history, hallucination, meditation, tragedy—all are invoked in this complex stream-of-consciousness memoir, which questions repeatedly and intrinsically: Why war? Why not peace?” The reviewer called the book “Complicated, convoluted, fascinating, and, in the final section, poignant almost beyond bearability” and saw it as “vintage Kingston”. Kirkus Reviews said the parts about Kingston’s family were the most “original and compelling” while finding the final section about Kingston’s writing workshops for veterans to be underwhelming.

In a briefly noted review, the New Yorker called the book “rich in empathy and moral conviction” and lauded Kingston’s storytelling to the point of regret that the original manuscript for The Fourth Book of Peace was never recovered. Meanwhile, Polly Shulman, writing for the New York Times, stated that Kingston’s juxtaposition of fiction and memoir was disappointing in The Fifth Book of Peace, especially in comparison to her previous works, such as The Woman Warrior, which were “remarkable” in execution.
