= China Men =

1980 collection of stories by Maxine Hong Kingston

- First edition dust jacket
- Author: Maxine Hong Kingston
- Language: English
- Genre: short-story cycle
- Publisher: Alfred A. Knopf
- Publication date: 1980
- Publication place: United States
- Media type: Print (hardback & paperback)
- Pages: 308
- ISBN: 0-394-42463-8

China Men is a 1980 collection of "stories" by Maxine Hong Kingston. It is a sequel to The Woman Warrior with a focus on the history of the men in Kingston's family. It won the 1981 National Book Award for Nonfiction. (Note: This was the award for hardcover "General Nonfiction". From 1980 to 1983 in National Book Awards history there were several nonfiction subcategories including General Nonfiction, with dual hardcover and paperback awards in most categories.)

Kingston wrote The Woman Warrior and China Men as one and would like them to be read together; she decided to publish them separately in fear that some of the men's stories might weaken the feminist perspective of the women's stories. The collection becomes what A. Robert Lee calls a "narrative genealogy" of Chinese settlement in the United States. To tell their stories, many of which Kingston heard only through the talk-story of the women in her family, she mixes the known history of her family with hypothetical imaginings and with the legal history of Chinese America. Her book presents a picture of a United States still changing in its reciprocal influence with China. At the same time, the title reflects a deliberate rejection of American racism against the Chinese: whereas the term "Chinaman" was a common slur (such as in John Chinaman), the Chinese referred to themselves as the "China Men" of the title: tang jen (Chinese: 唐人; pinyin: Tángrén; Jyutping: tong4 jan4).

Some of the main characters in the book include Kingston's great-grandfather Bak Goong, who worked on the sugar plantations in Hawaii; her grandfather Ah Goong, who worked for the railroad construction companies; her father BaBa, a gambling house owner and laundryman; and her unnamed brother, who receives no honor for fighting for the US in Vietnam. These characters are at times presented more as archetypes than as individuals, and at times there are competing versions of the story, as if the characters represent all the possible forefathers of the Chinese American population; as Elaine H. Kim points out, the father character "immigrates to America in five different ways, by way of Cuba, Angel Island, or Ellis Island [...] He could have entered the country legally, or he could have come as a paper son or by some other avenue. He is both 'the father from China' and 'the American father.'"

== Stories ==
Note: In the table of contents, the stories are given two different formats. There are six stories listed in all-caps, and 12 stories listed in italics. This formatting highlights what Kingston's construction of the structure: "China Men is like a six-layer cake and the myths are like icing." As E.D. Huntley explains, the layers refer to the six all-capped stories, "the stories of Kingston's ancestors", and the myths/icing are the italicized stories and include "traditional tales, revisions of myth, fantasy, and reconstructions of history, tracing the immigrant journey from China in the nineteenth century to the Asian American community in the late twentieth-century United States." The following list replicates the distinction in formatting between the "layers" and the "icing", replacing the all-caps with bold.

- On Discovery: the story of Tang Ao's discovery of the "Land of Women"
- On Fathers: a vignette in which the young narrator and her siblings mistake a neighbor for their own father
- The Father from China
- The Ghostmate: variations on a tale in which a young man becomes involved with a beautiful woman who, it turns out, is a ghost
- The Great Grandfather of the Sandalwood Mountains
- On Mortality: Li Fu-yen's story about Tu Tzu-chun, who ruins humanity's chance for immortality by failing to conquer the power of love
- On Mortality Again: a story about Maui the Trickster's attempt to provide immortality for humans by stealing it from the goddess Hina
- The Grandfather of the Sierra Nevada Mountains
- The Laws: a recitation of the history of U.S. immigration laws affecting the Chinese; note that this section is placed in the center of the book
- Alaska China Men: a brief overview of Chinese immigration and deportation in Alaska and of the origin of China Joe
- The Making of More Americans
- The Wild Man of the Green Swamp: the story of a Taiwanese immigrant who lived for eight months in 1975 in Florida's Green Swamp
- The Adventures of Lo Bun Sun: the Chinese story of the adventures of the sailor Lo Bun Sun, a Chinese name for Robinson Crusoe
- The American Father
- The Li Sao: An Elegy: the story of exiled Chinese poet Ch'ü Yüan, author of the Li Sao
- The Brother in Vietnam
- The Hundred-Year-Old Man: a short story about the life of a 106-year-old man and his memories of life in Hawaii since 1885
- On Listening: a short vignette in which the narrator is trying to follow a story about a visit to Manila in 1603 by three Chinese mandarins who may have made their way to America in search of a golden needle

== Themes ==
Kingston presents Chinese American history from its own perspective, presenting the men's views of American culture—the strange language with its incomprehensible alphabet, the violence and rigidity of missionary Christianity—and of their new communities, often made up of a mixture of Chinese regional backgrounds that would never have happened in China but are nevertheless immensely protective of each other and willing to mix their different Chinese traditions together.

Kingston has stated that her characters are trying to "claim America", so that even though they are prevented by those in power from settling down in the States and starting families, they are nonetheless "marking the land", such as by laying down the railroads with their numbered sections and by planting fruit trees. As Kim points out, they may be victimized by racism, but they are described by the narrator "as semi-mythical heroes", in terms of both their physical appearance (muscular "young gods [...] long torsos with lean stomachs") and in their heroism ("revolutionaries, nonconformists, people with fabulous imaginations, people who invented the Gold Mountains"), and they stand up for themselves in the face of all sorts of physical and legal violence. Many of the men succeed in setting down roots in America; in fact, those who give up are forgotten, all but erased from the family history. At the same time, the American-born younger generations (such as her brother), are equally adept at claiming America for themselves, even in the face of a series of wars against Asian cultures.

Scholar Jinqi Ling has pointed out that in her attempts to reconnect with her male ancestors, Kingston (and her narrator) often fulfills the role of creator and poet that was forbidden her ancestors. Although he mentions Ling focuses on BaBa, her father, who is described as a natural poet-scholar but whose artistic gifts were left out of the imperial examination system in China, ignored by his students in Canton, and irrelevant in the United States, which he enters only through deception. Once in America, his circumstances fare even worse, as he loses both his jobs, friends and money in the States and his remaining land in China. Kingston desires not only to understand her father but to give voice to the experiences and sufferings he was never given the opportunity to express because of his circumstances.
