= Sunset High School (Hayward, California) =

Location
- 22100 Princeton Street; Hayward, California 94541; United States
- Coordinates: 37°40′19″N 122°5′55″W

Information
- Type: Public high school
- Established: 1959
- Closed: 1990
- School district: Hayward Unified School District
- Campus type: Suburban
- Colors: Red and gold
- Team name: Falcons
- Yearbook: Aquila

Sunset High School was a public high school in Hayward, California, United States. It opened in 1959 and was closed in 1990. The campus now contains the Hayward Adult School vocational school, and Thomas Brenkwitz Continuation high school, both part of the Hayward Unified School District.

The Sunset High School campus is just west of the Bay Area Rapid Transit (BART) tracks, about one-half-mile north of the main Hayward BART station. There is a view of the playing fields and the back part of the campus from BART trains.

== History ==
At its creation in 1959, Sunset High School was part of the Hayward Union High School District, and continued to be until 1963, when that district was dissolved and all of its high schools became part of smaller unified school districts. At that time, Sunset High School became part of the Hayward Unified School District.

On September 25, 1959, the newly chartered State College for Alameda County – now California State University, East Bay – welcomed its first 293 students to classes in temporary quarters at Sunset High School. The high school was able to share space with the college because, during the 1959–1960 school year, the high school consisted of only the 9th and 10th grades. September 1961 was the first time Sunset had all four high school classes.

In the summer of 1966, runners from the track team got together and ran a continuous relay around the clock with the goal of beating Tennyson High School's World Record of a little over 4,000 miles completed in the summer of 1965. After 52 days, Sunset High School did set a World Record of 10,035 1/2 miles of non stop running. Each of the 24 runners ran one hour each.

In 1970, social studies students at Sunset High School researched and wrote the book A History of Hayward.

The school closed in 1990 due to declining enrollment.

== Notable alumni and teachers ==
- Lewis Feldman, professor of plant biology at the University of California, Berkeley; class of 1963
- Ed Galigher, professional football player who played for the San Francisco 49ers and the New York Jets; class of 1968
- Bud Harrelson, Major League Baseball shortstop and New York Mets coach and manager and Mets Hall of Famer; class of 1962
- Maxine Hong Kingston, taught English and mathematics at Sunset, 1965–1967; later became a famous author
- James R. Lambden, judge on the California First District Court of Appeal; class of 1968
- Dave Maggard, Olympian and university athletic director; head track coach at Sunset, 1964–1966
- Ed Sprague Sr., professional baseball pitcher; class of 1963
- Greg Tabor, professional baseball player for the Texas Rangers; class of 1979

== See also ==
- Alameda County High Schools
- San Lorenzo Unified School District, which operates the similarly named continuation high school in the Hayward area, Royal Sunset High School
