= Chinese folklore =

Chinese folklore encompasses the folklore of China, and includes songs, poetry, dances, puppetry, and tales. It often tells stories of human nature, historical or legendary events, love, and the supernatural. The stories often explain natural phenomena and distinctive landmarks. Along with Chinese mythology, it forms an important part of Chinese folk religion and religious Taoism.

== History ==
The history of Chinese folklore is tied to the nation's cultural, philosophical, and political evolution.

Chinese folklore traces its roots to prehistoric times, with early mythological narratives preserved in classical texts. The Classic of Mountains and Seas (Shan Hai Jing), dating back to the 4th century BCE, is a seminal compilation of mythic geography and creatures, giving humanity insights into the cosmological and cultural beliefs of early China. Another work, the Shiji (Records of the Grand Historian) by Sima Qian, composed during the Han dynasty, blends a historical account with a mythological element, setting a precedent for integrating folklore into Chinese historical narratives.

The evolution of Chinese folklore has been significantly shaped by the nation's major philosophical and religious traditions. Confucianism introduced themes of morality, social harmony, and filial piety, often reflected in tales emphasizing ethical conduct. Daoism contributed concepts of balance, nature, and immortality, leading to stories featuring deities and immortals with these ideals. With the introduction of Buddhism during the Han dynasty, narratives also then began to incorporate themes of karma, reincarnation, and spiritual enlightenment.

Chinese folklore then adapted to reflect the prevailing cultural and political climates. The Han dynasty's expansion facilitated monetary and cultural exchanges along the Silk Road, introducing new motifs and narratives. During the Tang and Song dynasties, periods marked by cultural prosperity, there was a significant increase in the documentation and dissemination of folk tales, aided by advancements in printing technology. These eras saw the emergence of renowned storytellers and poets who integrated folklore into their works. Tales from the Warring States period emphasize themes of heroism and survival amidst chaos. The Mongol invasions during the Yuan dynasty inspired stories of resistance and resilience. Similarly, the Opium Wars and subsequent foreign incursions led to narratives highlighting national pride and the struggle against oppression.

== The Four Great Folktales of China ==
The "four great folktales of China" are: The Butterfly Lovers (梁山伯與祝英台), Legend of the White Snake (白蛇傳), Lady Meng Jiang (孟姜女哭長城), and The Cowherd and the Weaver Girl (牛郎織女). These stories are cherished within Chinese culture and have been passed down through generations. They are known for their romantic and tragic love stories, and often incorporate elements of Chinese mythology, history, and folklore.

== Folktales ==
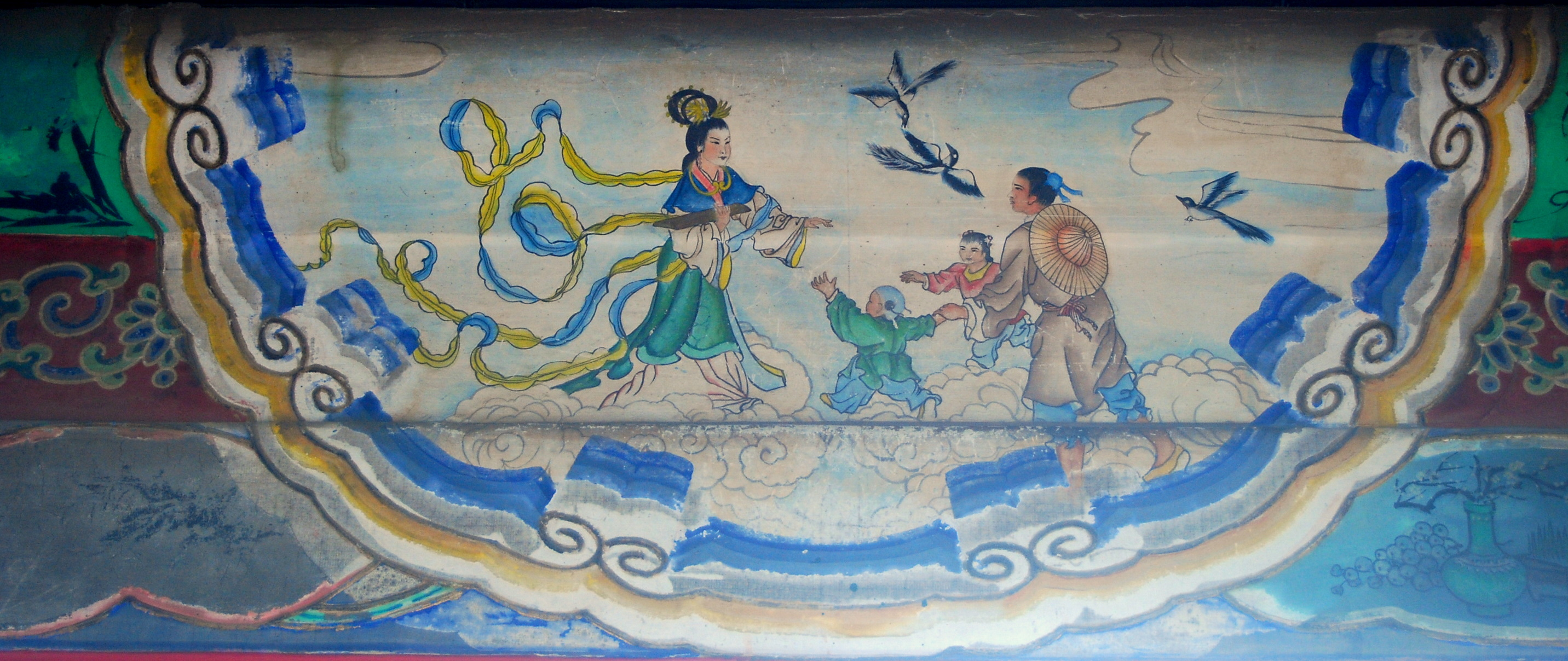
The reunion of The Cowherd and the Weaver Girl. Artwork in the Summer Palace in Beijing.

The main influences on Chinese folk tales have been Taoism, Confucianism and Buddhism. Some folktales may have arrived from Germany when the Grimm brothers had contributed some materials for the folktales regarding the country life of German dwellers since the 1840s; others have no known western counterparts, but are widespread throughout East Asia. Chinese folktales include a vast variety of forms such as myths, legends, fables, etc. A number of collections of such tales, such as Pu Songling's Strange Stories from a Chinese Studio, now remain popular.

Each Chinese folktale includes the representation of various objects and animals, and uses symbolic messages through its characters and usually strives to convey a message that instills the reader with some sort of ''virtuous" insight. These messages are vital to Chinese culture and through these folktales, they can be passed down to future generations to also learn from.

=== Animals ===
The Great Race is a folk story that describes the creation of the Chinese zodiac calendar that includes twelves animals each representing a specific year in a twelve-year cycle.

Chinese folklore contains many symbolic folk meanings for the objects and animals within the folktales. One example of this is the symbolic meaning behind frogs and toads. Toads are named Ch'an Chu (蟾蜍) in Chinese, a folklore about Ch'an Chu illustrates the toad imports the implication of eternal life and perpetual. Chinese folklore unfolds the story of a Ch'an Chu (toad) is saved by Liu Hai, who is a courtier in ancient Chinese period. For recompense the gratitude to Liu Hai, Ch' an Chu divulge the secret of eternal life and being immortal to Liu Hai. And this is the origin of Ch' an Chu as a symbol of eternal in traditional Chinese folklore culture.

In the "Chinese myth of the Moon Goddess, Chang'e", frogs and toads are a symbol of wealth and prosperity as well as symbolize fertility, regeneration, yin, and immortality. It is said that there were ten suns exposing the earth in the ancient times. Hou Yi who was an archer as well as the husband of Chang'e, he shot down nine suns from the sky with his bow and arrow. For expressing gratitude god rewarded him with pill which is an immortal elixir. In some versions of this tale, Chang'e took the pill for in avarice and she transformed into a three-legged Ch'an Chu and eventually flew to the moon. Hou Yi loved his wife so much that God allowed him to reunite annually with Chang'e at moment of the full moon on the 15th of August in Chinese lunar calendar, which is the celebration of Mid-Autumn Festival. From then on, the moon and Chang'e relate to the toad comprise the significance eternal and reunion.

== Study ==
Formal academic study of Chinese folklore began to gain popularity in the 1910s with the New Culture Movement, which advocated Vernacular Chinese as the language of education and literature. Because most folklore was created in the spoken language, this movement brought scholars' attention to the influences of folklore on classical literature. Hu Shi of Peking University, a strong advocate of Vernacular Chinese, concluded that when Chinese writers drew their inspiration from traditional tales and songs, Chinese literature experienced a renaissance. When writers neglected these sources, they lost touch with the people of the nation. An emphasis on the study of folklore, Hu concluded, could usher in a literary renaissance. A rising sense of national identity also spurred the new interest in traditional folklore. The first issue of the Folk-Song Weekly, a publication issued by the Folk-Song Research Society, stated that "Based on the folk songs, on the real feeling of the nation, a kind of new national poetry may be produced."

The Folksong Studies Movement became a key contributor to establishing Chinese folklore as a modern academic discipline. This movement was founded by Hu Shi's students and colleagues at Peking University, such as Gu Jiegang. They were successful in creating a field of study that focused on literature pertaining to Chinese folklore and attempted to bring to light the early traditions and culture of Chinese folklore in order to reestablish China's national spirit.; The May Fourth Movement in 1919 sparked patriotic students and scholars to collect and record historical folklore in both rural and urban areas. Folklore collections in the May Fourth Movement had a broad territorial sweep, including not only the ethnic Han, who form the majority, but also the minority areas. Folksong collection was carried by Peking University one year before the May Fourth Movement, started in 1918.

Some folklore enthusiasts also hoped to improve the condition of the Chinese people and believed it necessary to understand their ideas, beliefs, and customs. Communist activists and scholars collected songs and local lore, often, reinventing and reinterpreting them to emphasize such themes as the virtue of the working commoner and the evil of aristocracy, while they left out stories that expressed praise for the emperor or traditional Confucian values from their collections. Widely circulated stories of today may have been treated in this way. Some claimed that folksongs played a significant part in the integration of folklore culture in the early twentieth century of China, as well as a functional tool to convey the spirit of socialism and communism after the Liberation period. After China emerged from the Maoist period in the late 1970s, the state adopted a more accepting position toward academic research on China's cultural traditions and folklore. Forbidden traditions and practices in early Chinese history became more relevant and accepted.

== Poetry and songs ==
The Classic of Poetry, the earliest known Chinese collection of poetry, contains 160 folk songs in addition to courtly songs and hymns. One tradition holds that Confucius himself collected these songs, while another says that an emperor compiled them as a means to gauge the mood of the people and the effectiveness of his rule.

It is believed that Confucius did encourage his followers to study the songs contained in the Classic of Poetry, helping to secure the Classic of Poetry's place among the Five Classics. After Confucian ideas became further entrenched in Chinese culture (after about 100 BCE), Confucius's endorsement led many scholars to study the lyrics of the Classic of Poetry and interpret them as political allegories and commentaries.

Folksongs are divided into three major parts which are shan' ge (mountain songs), xiaodiao (little tunes), and chang'ge (long songs). Regarding shan'ge the mountain songs are having a deviation to represent the specific regional level, concentrating on rural rather than urban region. Xiaodiao can be considered as the mainstream folksongs among the genres, which are introduced to the general public with familiarity. Always accompanied by performs and professional stage shows presenting to the public. In terms of the chang'ge, long songs, which is a certain kind of narrative songs utilized mostly by the national minorities in some special events as a narrative form in singing.

== Influence of folklore on other media ==
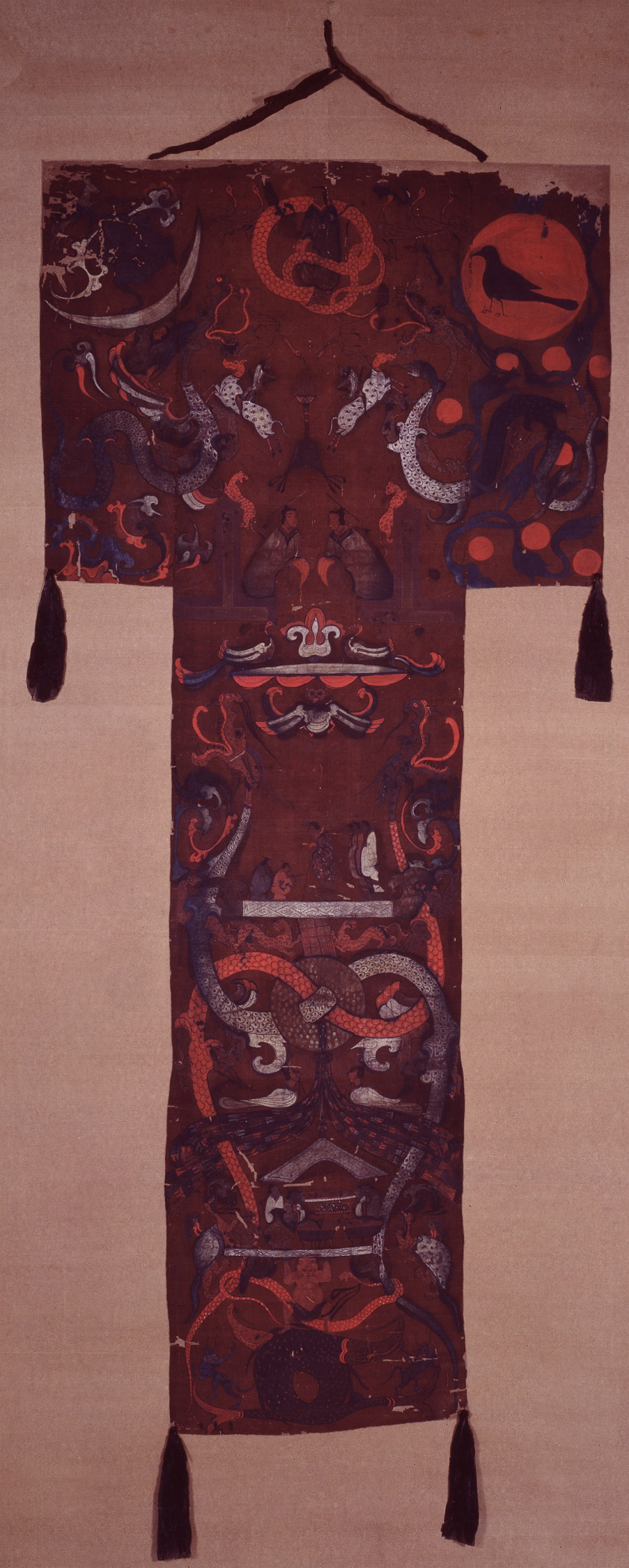
The Journey to eternal life of Lady Dai (Xin Chui). Mawangdui, Hunan Province, about 168 before the Common Era.

=== Art ===
Chinese folklore has provided inspiration for visual imagery by Chinese weavers, painters, water colorists, and florists. One of the most striking examples is a silk funerary banner (circa 168 BC) that contains a number of stories from early China.

=== Film ===
Modern iterations of traditional Chinese stories can be found internationally as well as in native Chinese literature. Laurence Yep's The Magic Paintbrush, Maxine Hong Kingston's The Woman Warrior, and Walt Disney Pictures' Mulan (based on Hua Mulan) all borrow from Chinese folklore traditions.

=== Literature ===
Chinese folklore has provided inspiration for Chinese writers and poets for centuries. Folk songs, which were originally accompanied by dance and other styles of performing arts, provided inspiration for courtly poetry. Classical fiction began in the Han dynasty and was modeled after oral traditions, while Yuan and Ming era dramatic plays were influenced by folk plays.

== See also ==
- Chinese literature
- Chinese mythology
- Classic Chinese Novels
- Dance in China
- Music of China
