= Ling Meng =

Chinese botanist

Ling Meng is a Chinese plant biologist in the Department of Plant and Microbial Biology at the University of California, Berkeley. She is currently a Postdoctoral Fellow at Lawrence Berkeley National Laboratory. She is best known for discovering a novel form of cellular communication in plants. Thioredoxin, while known to play an important role in biological processes such as cellular redox, is not fully understood in function. Meng's work at Berkeley has suggested that thioredoxin h9 is associated with the plasma membrane and is capable of moving from cell to cell through two important protein post-translation modifications: myristoylation and palmitoylation. She is the first to connect thioredoxin with the plasma membrane.

Meng received her M.A. in statistics in 2009 at the University of California, Berkeley. She received her Ph.D. in Agricultural and Environmental Chemistry in 2011 at the University of California, Berkeley.

== Master's Thesis ==
Meng, Ling (2009). Learning Algorithm and Model Selection for Protein-protein Interaction Inference in Arabidopsis. University of California, Berkeley. OCLC 793546692.

== Selected research papers ==
- S; Wong, L; Meng, L; Lemaux, P. G. Zhang (2002) Similarity of expression pattern of KN1 and ZmLEC1 during somatic and zygotic embryogenesis in maize (Zea mays L.), 191–194. In Planta.
- Bregitzer P, Zhang S, Lemaux PG Meng L (2003) Methylation of the exon/intron region in Ubi 1 Promoter Complex correlates with transgene silencing in Barley, 327–340. In Plant Molecular Biology.
- Lemaux PG Meng L (2003) A rapid and simple method for nuclear run-on transcription assay in plants. Plant Molecular Biology Reporter, 65–71. In Plant Molecular Biology Reporter.
- Chen C, Li L, Meng L, Singh, J, He Zh, and Lemaux PG Zhang S (2005) Evolutionary Expansion, Gene Structure, and Expression of the Rice Wall-Associated Kinase Gene Family, 1107–1124. In Plant Physiology.
- Ziv M, Lemaux, PG Meng L (2006) Nature of Stress and Type of Transgene Locus Influences Tendency of Transgenes to Silence in Barley, 15–28. In Plant Mol Biol.
- S, Gurel, E, Kaur, R, Wong, J, Meng L, Tan, H-Q, Lemaux, PG Gurel (2009) Efficient, Reproducible Agrobacterium-mediated Transformation of Sorghum Using Heat Treatment of Immature Embryos, 429–444. In Plant Cell Reports 28 (3).
- Meng, Ling; Feldman, Lewis (February 2010). "A rapid TRIzol-based two-step method for DNA-free RNA extraction from Arabidopsis siliques and dry seeds". Biotechnology Journal. 5 (2): 183–186. doi:10.1002/biot.200900211. ISSN 1860-6768. PMID 20108272. S2CID 205488667.
- Meng, Ling; Wong, Joshua H.; Feldman, Lewis; Lemaux, Peggy G.; Buchanan, Bob B. (2010-02-23). "A membrane-associated thioredoxin required for plant growth moves from cell to cell, suggestive of a role in intercellular communication". PNAS. 107 (8): 3900–3905. Bibcode:2010PNAS..107.3900M. doi:10.1073/pnas.0913759107. ISSN 1091-6490. OCLC 60637487. PMC 2840455. PMID 20133584.
- Meng, Ling; Zhang, Shibo; Lemaux, Peggy G. (March–April 2010). "Toward Molecular Understanding of In Vitro and In Planta Shoot Organogenesis". Critical Reviews in Plant Sciences. 29 (2): 108–122. doi:10.1080/07352681003617327. ISSN 0735-2689. S2CID 84680096.
- Meng, Ling; Ruth, Kenneth C.; Fletcher, Jennifer C.; Feldman, Lewis (2010-05-21). "The Roles of Different CLE Domains in Arabidopsis CLE Polypeptide Activity and Functional Specificity". Molecular Plant. 3 (4): 760–772. doi:10.1093/mp/ssq021. ISSN 1752-9867. OCLC 182552810. PMID 20494950.
- Meng, Ling; Feldman, Lewis J. (October 2010). "CLE14/CLE20 peptides may interact with CLAVATA2/CORYNE receptor-like kinases to irreversibly inhibit cell division in the root meristem of Arabidopsis". Planta. 232 (5): 1061–1074. doi:10.1007/s00425-010-1236-4. ISSN 1432-2048. OCLC 39973170. PMC 2940047. PMID 20697738.
- Jun, JiHyung; Fiume, Elisa; Roeder, Adrienne H. K.; Meng, Ling; Sharma, Vijay K.; Osmont, Karen S.; Baker, Catherine; Feldman, Lewis J.; Ha, Chan Man; Meyerowitz, Elliot M.; Fletcher, Jennifer C. (December 2010). "Comprehensive Analysis of CLE Polypeptide Signaling Gene Expression and Overexpression Activity in Arabidopsis". Plant Physiology. 154 (4): 1721–1736. doi:10.1104/pp.110.163683. OCLC 1642351. PMC 2996011. PMID 20884811.
- Meng, Ling; Feldman, Lewis J. (2011-01-01). "CLE genes may act in a variety of tissues/cells and involve other signaling cascades in addition to CLV3-WUS-like pathways". Plant Signaling & Behavior. 6 (1): 105–108. doi:10.4161/psb.6.1.14186. ISSN 1559-2316. PMC 3122018. PMID 21270538.
- Meng, Ling; Buchanan, Bob B.; Feldman, Lewis; Luan, Sheng (July 2012). "A Putative Nuclear CLE-Like (CLEL) Peptide Precursor Regulates Root Growth in Arabidopsis". Molecular Plant. 5 (4): 955–957. doi:10.1093/mp/sss060. ISSN 1674-2052. OCLC 182552810. PMID 22815541.
