= Lewis J. Feldman =

American botanist

- Born: October 10, 1945 (age 80)
- Education: University of California, Davis (B.S., 1967) University of California, Davis (M.S., 1969) Harvard University (Ph.D., 1975)
- Occupation: Professor of plant biology
- Employer: University of California, Berkeley
- Organization: Department of Plant & Microbial Biology
- Awards: Distinguished Teaching Award - UC Berkeley - 1996

Lewis Jeffrey Feldman (born October 10, 1945) is a professor of plant biology at the University of California, Berkeley, Director of the University of California Botanical Garden and previously Associate Dean for Academic Affairs in the College of Natural Resources. He is in the Department of Plant and Microbial Biology. Feldman has taught at Berkeley since 1978. He received Berkeley's Distinguished Teaching Award in 1996. Feldman's research focuses on regulation of development in meristems/stem cells, root gravitropism, and redox regulation of plant development.

After graduating in 1963 from Sunset High School in Hayward, California, Feldman attended the University of California, Davis, earning a B.S. in 1967, then an M.S. in 1969, both in Botany. He received a Ph.D. in biology from Harvard University in 1975.

Feldman is a fellow of the California Academy of Sciences.

== Honors and awards ==
- The Jeanette Siron Pelton Award - 1980
- CNR Teaching Award - College of Natural Resources - 1992
- Distinguished Teaching Award - University of California, Berkeley - 1996
- Outstanding Mentorship of Graduate Student Instructors - 1999

== Selected research papers ==
- Feldman, Lewis J.; Torrey, John Gordon (March 1976). "The Isolation and Culture in Vitro of the Quiescent Center of Zea mays". American Journal of Botany. 63 (3): 345–355. doi:10.2307/2441580. ISSN 1537-2197. JSTOR 2441580. OCLC 505784972.
- Jiang, Keni; Feldman, Lewis J. (November 2005). "Regulation of Root Apical Meristem Development" (PDF). Annual Review of Cell and Developmental Biology. 21: 485–509. doi:10.1146/annurev.cellbio.21.122303.114753. ISSN 1081-0706. PMID 16212504. Archived from the original (PDF) on 2012-04-02.
- Jiang, Keni; Zhang, Shibo; Lee, Stanley; Tsai, George; Kim, Kyungpil; Huang, Haiyan; Chilcott, Charles; Feldman, Lewis J.; Zhu, Tong (February 2006). "Transcription Profile Analyses Identify Genes and Pathways Central to Root Cap Functions in Maize". Plant Molecular Biology. 60 (3): 343–363. Bibcode:2006PMolB..60..343J. doi:10.1007/s11103-005-4209-4. ISSN 1573-5028. OCLC 37915901. PMID 16514559. S2CID 24103548.
- Jiang, Keni; Ballinger, Tracy; Li, Daisy; Zhang, Shibo; Feldman, Lewis (March 2006). "A Role for Mitochondria in the Establishment and Maintenance of the Maize Root Quiescent Center". Plant Physiology. 140 (3): 1118–1125. doi:10.1104/pp.105.071977. OCLC 1642351. PMC 1400572. PMID 16443698.
- Jiang, Keni; Schwarzer, Christian; Lally, Elizabeth; Zhang, Shibo; Ruzin, Steven; Machen, Terry; Remington, S. James; Feldman, Lewis (June 2006). "Expression and Characterization of a Redox-Sensing Green Fluorescent Protein (Reduction-Oxidation-Sensitive Green Fluorescent Protein) in Arabidopsis". Plant Physiology. 141 (2): 397–403. doi:10.1104/pp.106.078246. OCLC 1642351. PMC 1475439. PMID 16760494.
- Kim, Kyungpil; Zhang, Shibo; Jiang, Keni; Cai, Li; Lee, In-Beum; Feldman, Lewis J; Huang, Haiyan (2007-01-27). "Measuring similarities between gene expression profiles through new data transformations". BMC Bioinformatics. 8 29: 29–43. doi:10.1186/1471-2105-8-29. ISSN 1471-2105. OCLC 48656745. PMC 1804284. PMID 17257435.
- Jiang, Keni; Zhu, Tong; Diao, Zhaoyan; Huang, Haiyan; Feldman, Lewis J. (January 2010). "The maize root stem cell niche: a partnership between two sister cell populations". Planta. 231 (2): 411–424. Bibcode:2010Plant.231..411J. doi:10.1007/s00425-009-1059-3. ISSN 1432-2048. PMC 2799627. PMID 20041334.
- Meng, Ling; Feldman, Lewis (February 2010). "A rapid TRIzol-based two-step method for DNA-free RNA extraction from Arabidopsis siliques and dry seeds". Biotechnology Journal. 5 (2): 183–186. doi:10.1002/biot.200900211. ISSN 1860-6768. PMID 20108272. S2CID 205488667.
- Jiang, Keni; Feldman, Lewis J (February 2010). "Positioning of the auxin maximum affects the character of cells occupying the root stem cell niche". Plant Signaling & Behavior. 5 (2): 202–204. Bibcode:2010PlSiB...5..202J. doi:10.4161/psb.5.2.11188. ISSN 1559-2316. PMC 2884136. PMID 20173411.
- Meng, Ling; Wong, Joshua H.; Feldman, Lewis; Lemaux, Peggy G.; Buchanan, Bob B. (2010-02-23). "A membrane-associated thioredoxin required for plant growth moves from cell to cell, suggestive of a role in intercellular communication". PNAS. 107 (8): 3900–3905. Bibcode:2010PNAS..107.3900M. doi:10.1073/pnas.0913759107. ISSN 1091-6490. OCLC 60637487. PMC 2840455. PMID 20133584.
- Jubany-Marí, Tana; Alegre-Batlle, Leonor; Jiang, Keni; Feldman, Lewis J. (2010-03-05). Schroeder, Julian (ed.). "Use of a redox-sensing GFP (c-roGFP1) for real-time monitoring of cytosol redox status in Arabidopsis thaliana water-stressed plants". FEBS Letters. 584 (5): 889–897. Bibcode:2010FEBSL.584..889J. doi:10.1016/j.febslet.2010.01.014. OCLC 1569056. PMID 20079738. S2CID 207587649.
- Rosenwasser, Shilo; Rot, Ilona; Meyer, Andreas J.; Feldman, Lewis; Jiang, Keni; Friedman, Haya (April 2010). "A fluorometer-based method for monitoring oxidation of redox-sensitive GFP (roGFP) during development and extended dark stress". Physiologia Plantarum. 138 (4): 493–502. Bibcode:2010PPlan.138..493R. doi:10.1111/j.1399-3054.2009.01334.x. ISSN 0031-9317. PMID 20051029.
- De Tullio, Mario C.; Jiang, Keni; Feldman, Lewis J. (May 2010). "Redox regulation of root apical meristem organization: connecting root development to its environment". Plant Physiology and Biochemistry. 48 (5): 328–336. Bibcode:2010PlPB...48..328D. doi:10.1016/j.plaphy.2009.11.005. ISSN 0981-9428. PMID 20031434.
- Meng, Ling; Ruth, Kenneth C.; Fletcher, Jennifer C.; Feldman, Lewis (2010-05-21). "The Roles of Different CLE Domains in Arabidopsis CLE Polypeptide Activity and Functional Specificity". Molecular Plant. 3 (4): 760–772. doi:10.1093/mp/ssq021. ISSN 1752-9867. OCLC 182552810. PMID 20494950.
- Meng, Ling; Feldman, Lewis J. (October 2010). "CLE14/CLE20 peptides may interact with CLAVATA2/CORYNE receptor-like kinases to irreversibly inhibit cell division in the root meristem of Arabidopsis". Planta. 232 (5): 1061–1074. Bibcode:2010Plant.232.1061M. doi:10.1007/s00425-010-1236-4. ISSN 1432-2048. OCLC 39973170. PMC 2940047. PMID 20697738.
- Jun, JiHyung; Fiume, Elisa; Roeder, Adrienne H. K.; Meng, Ling; Sharma, Vijay K.; Osmont, Karen S.; Baker, Catherine; Feldman, Lewis J.; Ha, Chan Man; Meyerowitz, Elliot M.; Fletcher, Jennifer C. (December 2010). "Comprehensive Analysis of CLE Polypeptide Signaling Gene Expression and Overexpression Activity in Arabidopsis". Plant Physiology. 154 (4): 1721–1736. doi:10.1104/pp.110.163683. OCLC 1642351. PMC 2996011. PMID 20884811.
- Meng, Ling; Feldman, Lewis J. (2011-01-01). "CLE genes may act in a variety of tissues/cells and involve other signaling cascades in addition to CLV3-WUS-like pathways". Plant Signaling & Behavior. 6 (1): 105–108. Bibcode:2011PlSiB...6..105M. doi:10.4161/psb.6.1.14186. ISSN 1559-2316. PMC 3122018. PMID 21270538.
- Stonebloom, Solomon; Brunkard, Jacob O.; Cheung, Alexander C.; Jiang, Keni; Feldman, Lewis J.; Zambryski, Patricia C. (January 2012). "Redox states of plastids and mitochondria differentially regulate intercellular transport via plasmodesmata". Plant Physiology. 158 (1): 190–199. doi:10.1104/pp.111.186130. ISSN 0032-0889. OCLC 174459230. PMC 3252087. PMID 22074709.
- Kim, Kyungpil; Jiang, Keni; Teng, Siew Leng; Feldman, Lewis J; Huang, Haiyan (2012-01-23). "Using biologically interrelated experiments to identify pathway genes in Arabidopsis". Bioinformatics. 28 (6): 815–822. doi:10.1093/bioinformatics/bts038. ISSN 1367-4803. OCLC 848277860. PMC 3307114. PMID 22271267.
- Meng, Ling; Buchanan, Bob B.; Feldman, Lewis; Luan, Sheng (July 2012). "A Putative Nuclear CLE-Like (CLEL) Peptide Precursor Regulates Root Growth in Arabidopsis". Molecular Plant. 5 (4): 955–957. doi:10.1093/mp/sss060. ISSN 1674-2052. OCLC 182552810. PMID 22815541.
- Szymanowska-Pułka, Joanna; Potocka, Izabela; Karczewski, Jerzy; Jiang, Keni; Nakielski, Jerzy; Feldman, Lewis (2012-06-14). "Principal growth directions in development of the lateral root in Arabidopsis thaliana". Annals of Botany. 110 (2): 491–501. doi:10.1093/aob/mcs129. ISSN 1095-8290. OCLC 517499692. PMC 3394657. PMID 22700942.

== Other writings ==
- Feldman, Lewis (1997-02-10). "Evolution of Light- and Gravity-Sensing Genes in Plants". Washington, D.C.: NASA. Archived from the original on 2011-09-30. "The hypothesis advanced here is that the signal transduction pathway for gravitaxis (gravitropism) evolved by building on and/or incorporating signal transduction steps which evolved earlier in connection with prokaryotes responding to light." (An abstract for a presentation)
- Feldman, Lewis; Berry, Alison (2007). "John Gordon Torrey 1921-1993 - A Biographical Memoir" (PDF). Washington, D.C.: National Academy of Sciences. Archived from the original (PDF) on 2012-10-18. "John Gordon Torrey was a forthright, honest, highly principled man, and a groundbreaking plant scientist."
