= Don (academia) =

Fellow or tutor of a traditional college

A don is an academic, particularly in British English. The term is particularly applied to fellows and tutors of colleges at traditional collegiate universities but is also used more generally for teaching staff at universities and colleges. The usage is also found in Canada and in rare instances in the United States.

Like the term don used for Roman Catholic priests, the term don derives from the Latin dominus, meaning "lord", and is a historical remnant of Oxford and Cambridge having started as ecclesiastical institutions in the Middle Ages.

The term don is also used for schoolmasters at Winchester College, where as well as the term generally meaning "teacher", there are also "Div Dons", form masters, and "House Dons", housemasters; and at Radley College, another boys-only boarding school modelled after Oxford colleges of the early 19th century.

At some universities in Canada, such as the University of King's College and the University of New Brunswick, a don is the senior head of a university residence. At these institutions, a don is typically a faculty member, staff member, or postgraduate student, whose responsibilities in the residence are primarily administrative. The don supervises their residence and a team of undergraduate resident assistants, proctors, or other student employees.

In other Canadian institutions, such as Huron College and the University of Toronto, a don is a resident assistant, typically an upper-year student paid a stipend to act as an advisor to and supervisor of the students in a university residence.

== In the United Kingdom ==
The word don was originally used in the UK for a fellow or tutor of a college or university, particularly at traditional collegiate universities, and has come to be a casual term used for any academic.

The academic usage dates back to the 17th century and, like the title of don used for Roman Catholic priests and for Spanish, Italian and Portuguese noblemen, derives from the Latin dominus, meaning "lord". It is either derived from an application of the Spanish title to one having authority or position, or from the academical use of dominus, which was still in use in the early 20th century as a title for a bachelor of arts at Cambridge and other universities. An English corruption, "dan", was in early use as a title of respect, equivalent to master. The particular literary application to poets is due to Edmund Spenser's use of "Dan Chaucer, well of English undefiled."

The adjective donnish derives from don and refers to someone who is rather serious (often too serious) or intellectual.

== In Canada ==
At some universities in Canada, such as the University of King's College and the University of New Brunswick, a don is the senior head of a university residence. At these institutions, a don is typically a faculty member, staff member, or postgraduate student, whose responsibilities in the residence are primarily administrative. The don supervises their residence and a team of undergraduate resident assistants, proctors, or other student employees.

In other Canadian institutions, such as Huron College and the University of Toronto, a don is a resident assistant, typically an upper-year student paid a stipend to act as an advisor to and supervisor of the students in a university residence.

== In the United States ==
At Sarah Lawrence College, faculty advisors are referred to as "dons". Dons meet regularly with students to plan a course of study.

The "Don" is also an official mascot of the athletic teams of the University of San Francisco, Spanish Fork High School, Arroyo High School, Amador Valley High School, and Susan Miller Dorsey High School.

== See also ==
- Academic rank
