= MEHS =

MEHS may refer to:

- Maynard Evans High School, Orlando, Florida, United States
- Mount Eden High School, Hayward, California, United States
- Mount Edgecumbe High School, Sitka, Alaska, United States
