= Tripmaster Monkey =

1989 novel by Maxine Hong Kingston

Tripmaster Monkey: His Fake Book
- First edition
- Author: Maxine Hong Kingston
- Language: English
- Publisher: Vintage Books USA
- Publication date: 1990
- Publication place: United States
- ISBN: 978-0-679-72789-7

Tripmaster Monkey: His Fake Book is the third book written by Maxine Hong Kingston, and was published in 1989. The story follows Wittman Ah Sing, an American graduate of University of California, Berkeley of Chinese ancestry in his adventures about San Francisco during the 1960s. Heavily influenced by the Beat movement, and exhibiting many prototypical features of postmodernism, the book retains numerous themes, such as ethnicity and prejudice, addressed in Kingston's other works. The novel is rampant with allusions to pop-culture and literature, especially the 16th century Chinese novel Journey to the West.

== Characters ==
- Wittman Ah Sing is the protagonist of the novel, with his name being a reference to Walt Whitman. He is an American graduate of the University of California, Berkeley and is of Chinese ancestry. The novel mainly follows his actions and changing attitudes towards his ancestry and life in general. With "partial verification by Kingston", writer Amy Ling believes the character is somewhat based on a critic of the author of the novel, Frank Chin.
- Taña De Weese is a woman who meets Wittman at a wild party, eventually marrying him in order for Wittman to avoid being drafted to fight in the Vietnam War. She is a white American and introduces Wittman to her parents, signifying Wittman's increasing comfort with white American culture.
- Nanci Lee attended the University of California, Berkeley with Wittman, and dates Wittman at the beginning of the novel. She is relatively conservative and is, like Wittman, an American of Chinese ancestry. Their shared ancestry influences Wittman's decision to ask her out and his emotions during the relationship. She ends their relationship when he does an imitation of the monkey king Sun Wukong from the Chinese epic novel, Journey to the West, in front of her.

== Synopsis ==
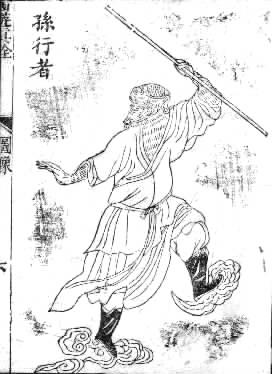
A sketch, similar in style to this one, appears at the beginning of every chapter. This sketch, like the illustrations found in the book, depicts the fictional character Sun Wukong.

Set in the San Francisco Bay Area during the 1960s, Wittman Ah Sing is conflicted over his Chinese ancestry. He looks down on immigrants from China and refers to them as fobs, while also resenting Asian-American women who alter their appearance to appear more white and know little about the culture of the countries their ancestors came from. He asks Nanci Lee, who is also of Chinese ancestry, out on a date.

As time goes on, Wittman become more and more upset at the racism towards Asian people he sees around him. His thoughts become more fixated on the similarities between himself, and the character of a monkey king, Sun Wukong from the Chinese epic novel Journey to the West, giving the novel its name. He loses his job at a department store after becoming irritated at a customer and positioning wind-up monkey toys and barbie dolls in sexual positions. Nanci Lee ends their relationship after Wittman begins imitating the monkey king in front of her.

Wittman then goes to a party mainly attended by followers of the Beatnik movement. After overhearing a woman, Taña De Weese, reciting poetry, Wittman composes the basic structure of a play. Only a few of the guests are sober, not under the influence of drugs, and awake the morning after the party, and Wittman briefly performs his play. Wittman and Taña walk home from the party through a park, and are married by a priest so that Wittman will not be drafted to fight in the Vietnam War.

Wittman cannot find work, and eventually decides he should put on his play at a local community center. After rehearsing, the play is reproduced in the text of the novel. The play is quite long and resembles an epic legend. On the closing night of the play, Wittman gives a monologue that establishes he has accepted his ancestry and culture.

== Themes and motifs ==
I’m including everything that is being left out, and everybody who has no place. My idea for the Civil Rights Movement is that we integrate jobs, schools, buses, housing, lunch counters, yes, and we also integrate theater and parties.

— Wittman Ah Sing

=== Multiculturalism ===
Wittman is bothered by the perception that his culture is considered Asian, instead of Western. He repeatedly states that the culture he has as a result of his Chinese ancestry is part of Western culture.

=== Prejudice ===
Wittman almost constantly thinks about the racism and prejudice in American society. He is angry at the discrimination faced by non-white Americans, yet he is embarrassed by the behavior of recent Chinese immigrants. He also compares the discrimination faced by Americans of Asian descent versus that faced by Latinos or Blacks.

== Writing style ==
The writing style mainly consists of elements typical of postmodernism, especially a disjointed story line. The book is written entirely in stream of consciousness form and it is difficult to tell what is happening in reality versus only in Wittman's mind. There are constant references to the Chinese language, American literature, and English literature. Some of the stylistic elements are similar to those in The Woman Warrior, another book written by Kingston.

=== Allusions ===
Although the novel is full of allusions to other works of literature, it is mainly based on Ulysses by James Joyce, "Song of Myself" by Walt Whitman, and the epic Chinese novel Journey to the West. Ulysses is itself based on the epic Greek poem The Odyssey. Other frequently alluded to works include Griever: An American Monkey King in China by Gerald Vizenor, The Notebooks of Malte Laurids Brigge by Rainer Maria Rilke, and Hamlet by William Shakespeare.
