= Tre Demps =

American basketball player

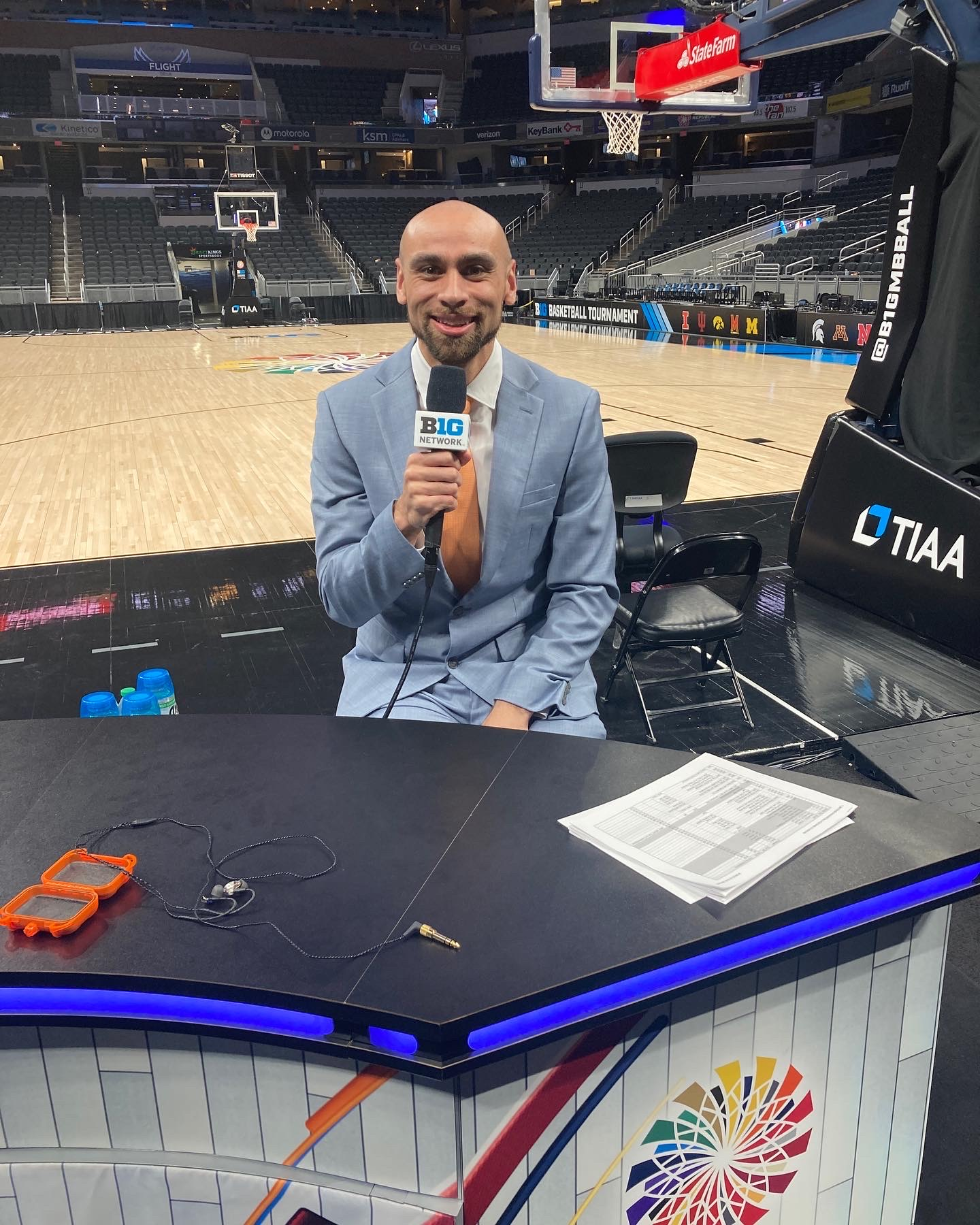

Personal information
- Born: May 21, 1993 (age 33) Portland, Oregon, U.S.
- Listed height: 6 ft 3 in (1.91 m)
- Listed weight: 195 lb (88 kg)

Career information
- High school: Ronald Reagan (San Antonio, Texas)
- College: Northwestern (2011–2016)
- NBA draft: 2016: undrafted
- Playing career: 2016–2021
- Position: Point guard / shooting guard

Career history
- 2016–2018: Belfius Mons-Hainaut
- 2018–2019: Vanoli Cremona
- 2019: Kolossos Rodou
- 2019–2020: San Severo

Delano Jerome "Tre" Demps III (born May 21, 1993) is a former American professional basketball player and current basketball analyst. He played college basketball at Northwestern.

== Early life and high school ==
Demps was born in Portland, Oregon to Serene Wilson and Dell Demps. He grew up in the East Bay Area of California, but moved frequently during his childhood. He eventually settled in San Antonio, Texas after his father Dell was named the director of player personnel by the San Antonio Spurs. He attended and played basketball at Ronald Reagan High School and was named All-State twice. After averaging 19 points and four assists per game as a junior, Demps committed Northwestern over offers from Minnesota and Colorado.

== College career ==
Demps played five seasons for the Wildcats, redshirting his freshman year after suffering a season-ending shoulder injury after four games. He finished his collegiate career with 1,518 points (12th-most in school history), 353 rebounds and 288 assists over 132 games (3rd-most in school history) and was named honorable mention All-Big Ten during his redshirt junior and senior seasons when he averaged 12.5 and 15.7 points per game. Following his redshirt senior season, Demps participated in the Portsmouth Invitational Tournament and led his team in scoring in each of its three games and averaged 16.3 points per game overall.

== Professional career ==
=== Belfius ===
After going unselected in the 2016 NBA draft, Demps was signed by Chicago Bulls to their NBA Summer League roster but did not receive any playing time. Demps then signed with Belfius Mons-Hainaut of the Belgian Pro Basketball League (PBL) on July 20, 2016. In his first season of professional basketball, he averaged 14.2 points, 2.1 rebounds and 1.8 assists in 38 games. In his second season with the team, Demps averaged 13.6 points in 37 PBL games and 16.1 points in 16 games during the 2017–18 FIBA Europe Cup and was named to the Eurobasket.com All-Imports Team.

=== Vanoli Cremona ===
Demps signed with Vanoli Cremona of Italy's Lega Basket Serie A (LBA) on July 16, 2018. Cremona announced that Demps and the team had agreed to part ways on February 25, 2019. Demps averaged 10.5 points, 2.1 rebounds, and 1.2 assists in 17 games for Cremona.

=== Kolossos Rodou ===
Demps signed with Kolossos Rodou of the Greek Basket League (GBL) on February 26, 2019. He played in 10 games, all off the bench, and averaged 8.4 points, 3.0 rebounds and 1.6 assists per game as Kolossos finished last in the league with a 5–21 record.

=== San Severo ===
Demps returned to Italy after signing with Cestistica San Severo of the Italian second division, Serie A2 Basket, on July 29, 2019. He averaged 18.6 points, 3.6 rebounds and 3.2 assists per game and was named Player of the Month for September.

On July 9, 2020, Demps signed with MHP Riesen Ludwigsburg. However, he parted ways with the team on October 1.

On May 10, 2022, Demps announced his retirement from basketball after battling hip arthritis. He now works as an analyst for NBC Sports and CBS Sports Network, following two seasons with the Big Ten Network.

== Personal life ==
Demps is the son of former professional basketball player and former New Orleans Pelicans general manager Dell Demps. Tre is married to Heather Demps (née John), they have three children. He has spoken publicly about his Christian faith, which he has had since 2011.
