= Emerson-Thoreau Medal =

American literary award

The Emerson-Thoreau Medal is a literary prize awarded by the American Academy of Arts and Sciences to persons for their total literary achievement in the broad field of literature rather than for a specific work. Established in 1958, the prize is given at the discretion of the Council of the Academy on the recommendation of a nominating committee.

== Recipients of the Emerson-Thoreau Medal ==
- 1958 Robert Frost (poet)
- 1959 Thomas Stearns Eliot (poet, critic, playwright)
- 1960 Henry Beston (naturalist, countryman, author)
- 1961 Samuel Eliot Morison (biographer, historian, scholar)
- 1962 Katherine Anne Porter (novelist)
- 1963 Mark Van Doren (poet, critic, teacher)
- 1965 Lewis Mumford (teacher, critic, philosopher)
- 1966 Edmund Wilson (critic, man of letters)
- 1967 Joseph Wood Krutch (critic, biographer, naturalist)
- 1968 John Crowe Ransom (poet, critic, man of letters)
- 1969 Hannah Arendt (social and political historian and philosopher)
- 1970 I. A. Richards (poet, critic, teacher of critics)
- 1975 Robert Penn Warren (novelist, poet, critic, teacher)
- 1977 Saul Bellow (teacher, novelist, critic of society)
- 1979 James T. Farrell (novelist, critic, essayist)
- 1989 Norman Mailer (novelist, critic, man of letters)
- 2013 Philip Roth (novelist and memoirist)
- 2016 Toni Morrison (novelist)
- 2019 Margaret Atwood (poet)
- 2023 Maxine Hong Kingston (author)
