= Esa Pole =

American football player (born 2001)

No. 77 – Washington Commanders
- Position: Offensive tackle
- Roster status: Practice squad

Personal information
- Born: July 4, 2001 (age 25); Hayward, California, U.S.
- Listed height: 6 ft 7 in (2.01 m)
- Listed weight: 319 lb (145 kg)

Career information
- High school: Mt. Eden (Hayward)
- College: Chabot College (2021–2022); Washington State (2023–2024)
- NFL draft: 2025: undrafted

Career history
- Kansas City Chiefs (2025)*; New York Jets (2025); Kansas City Chiefs (2025); Washington Commanders (2026–present)*
- * Offseason or practice squad member only

Career NFL statistics as of 2025
- Games played: 5
- Games started: 4
- Stats at Pro Football Reference

Esa Pole (born July 4, 2001) is an American professional football offensive tackle for the Washington Commanders of the National Football League (NFL). He played college football for the Chabot Gladiators and Washington State Cougars.

== Early life ==
Pole was a standout high school basketball player at Mount Eden High School; however, he committed to play college football at Chabot College despite never playing football before.

== College career ==
=== Chabot College ===
During his two-year career at Chabot in 2021 and 2022, Pole was a two-year starter, a unanimous all-conference selection, and an All-Region 1 first-teamer.

=== Washington State ===
Pole transferred to play for the Washington State Cougars. In 2023, he made eight starts at left tackle. In 2024, Pole started all 13 games and did not allow any sacks. After the season, he declared for the 2025 NFL draft, while also accepting an invite to the 2025 East–West Shrine Bowl.

== Professional career ==
Pre-draft measurables
Height	Weight	Arm length	Hand span	Wingspan	40-yard dash	10-yard split	20-yard split	20-yard shuttle	Three-cone drill	Vertical jump	Broad jump	Bench press
6 ft 5 1/4 in (1.96 m)	323 lb (147 kg)	33 5/8 in (0.85 m)	9 7/8 in (0.25 m)	6 ft 9 in (2.06 m)	5.29 s	1.87 s	3.01 s	4.72 s	8.03 s	29.0 in (0.74 m)	8 ft 4 in (2.54 m)	23 reps
All values from Pro Day

=== Kansas City Chiefs (first stint) ===
Pole signed with the Kansas City Chiefs as an undrafted free agent on May 3, 2025. He was waived on August 26 as part of final roster cuts.

=== New York Jets ===
On August 27, 2025, Pole was claimed off waivers by the New York Jets. He was waived on October 23.

=== Kansas City Chiefs (second stint) ===
On October 25, 2025, Pole was signed to the Kansas City Chiefs' practice squad. On December 3, he was signed to the active roster. On December 7, Pole made his NFL debut after left tackle Wanya Morris was injured on the first play. Pole played 98 percent of offensive snaps in his debut, allowing only 3 pressures and committing one false start penalty. He proceeded to start the remainder of the season at left tackle.

On August 30, 2026, Pole was waived by the Chiefs as a part of final roster cuts.

=== Washington Commmanders ===
On September 1, 2026, the Washington Commanders signed Pole to their practice squad.

== Personal life ==
His older brother, Toni Pole, previously played as a defensive lineman at Washington State.
