= I Love a Broad Margin to My Life =

2011 memoir by Maxine Hong Kingston

- Author: Maxine Hong Kingston
- Publication date: January 18, 2011
- Pages: 240
- ISBN: 978-0307270191
- Preceded by: Veterans of War, Veterans of Peace

I Love a Broad Margin to My Life is a 2011 memoir by Maxine Hong Kingston, published by Knopf.

== Contents and background ==
The book's title is derived from Henry David Thoreau who, according to Kingston, "said that he loved a broad margin to his life ... And I could think of that to mean many things: that he wanted to be far away from other people; he wanted to find solitude; he wanted to be in the woods and not the city. But he never could get away. He could not get away from human problems." Kingston ultimately fixated on the word "margin" in Thoreau's statement as a synonym of border, a construct indicative of broader problems of war. Kingston, in her remarks to the Library of America, stated that Thoreau and herself bore similarities through the "margin" when they both went to jail in their respective protestations of the government: Thoreau for withholding taxes during the war against Mexico, Kingston for protesting the Iraq War.

Kingston began writing the book in 2005 just before her 65th birthday. Part-memoir, part-poetry, the book tackles a wide variety of topics including characters from Kingston's past works, her real-life experiences such as a 2003 arrest after a Code Pink demonstration, and her thoughts on modern Chinese history and Chinese American culture. Kingston also stated that in the few years she spent writing the book alone, many of her loved ones had passed.

== Critical reception ==
Publishers Weekly likened Kingston's free verse style to that of her idol, Walt Whitman, and pointed out the book's myriad of references to Kingston's past works: Wittman Ah Sing, racial stereotypes, east-meets-west sensibilities, among others. The reviewer found that although the book "often rambles, it also has the cohesion and intricate logic of a musical composition." Kirkus Reviews similarly observed Kingston's homage to Whitman but felt that there were interesting, sometimes ineffectual deviations: "Weaving together seemingly disparate subjects, from the death toll of the Iraq War to details about her marriage, she repeatedly articulates an urgent need to translate her deceased father’s writings from Chinese to English ... The meandering, meditative nature of the narrative is reminiscent of a journal filled with nonsequiturs and sketches, but it lacks a compelling structure."

David Orr, writing for the New York Times, saw Kingston's book as a new contribution to the longstanding tradition of "nonpoet poets". Orr posed the question of whether the book effectually counted as poetry, citing Kingston's attempt in 2002 with To Be the Poet, which Orr considered to be navel-gazing and "Well, anyway ... not the best way to get actual poetry written." With regard to I Love a Broad Margin to My Life, Orr found its beginning to be successful but stated that the second half was imprecise and, at times, "bad Whitman."

Other critics sought to decipher and bring order to what some considered to be a sprawling, chaotic work of literature. Manan Desai, in Hyphen, speculated that Kingston's primary goal with the book must have been to "deconstruct the memoir" and to be "thinking deeply about the act of writing itself." However, Desai also pointed out other intentions, namely Kingston's revival of her previous characters like Wittman Ah Sing and her meditations on aging, history, globalization, among other topics. In her conclusion, Desai said "Ultimately, Broad Margin is a dense, complex piece of work, and the pleasure of reading it comes from trying to figure out how its entangled and frayed threads all tie together." NPR read the book similarly, calling it an "unconventional, somewhat rambling, intermittently arresting memoir in verse". Joan Frank, in SFGate, called Kingston's reflections on aging bold and found the sections pertaining to Wittman Ah Sing's adventures to be "the best part of this work, cinematic and sensual."
