= Ed Galigher =

American football player (1950–2018)

No. 85, 75
- Positions: Defensive tackle, defensive end

Personal information
- Born: October 15, 1950; Hayward, California, U.S.
- Died: November 27, 2018 (aged 68); Los Angeles, California, U.S.
- Listed height: 6 ft 4 in (1.93 m)
- Listed weight: 255 lb (116 kg)

Career information
- High school: Sunset (Hayward)
- College: UCLA
- NFL draft: 1972: 4th round, 89th overall pick

Career history
- New York Jets (1972–1976); San Francisco 49ers (1977–1979)

Career NFL statistics
- Games played: 87
- Games started: 26
- Fumble recoveries: 6
- Stats at Pro Football Reference

Edward Albert Galigher (October 15, 1950 – November 27, 2018) was an American professional football defensive lineman who played for seven seasons for the San Francisco 49ers and the New York Jets.

Galigher graduated from Sunset High School in Hayward, California in 1968.

Galigher played football for Chabot College in Hayward in 1968 and 1969.
