= Hayward Unified School District =

Public school district in Hayward, California

Location
- Hayward, California United States

District information
- Type: Public
- Motto: Building a Culture of Success. All Means All.
- Grades: K-12, adult education
- Schools: 32

Students and staff
- Students: 21,000
- Teachers: 950

Other information
- Website: Hayward Unified School District

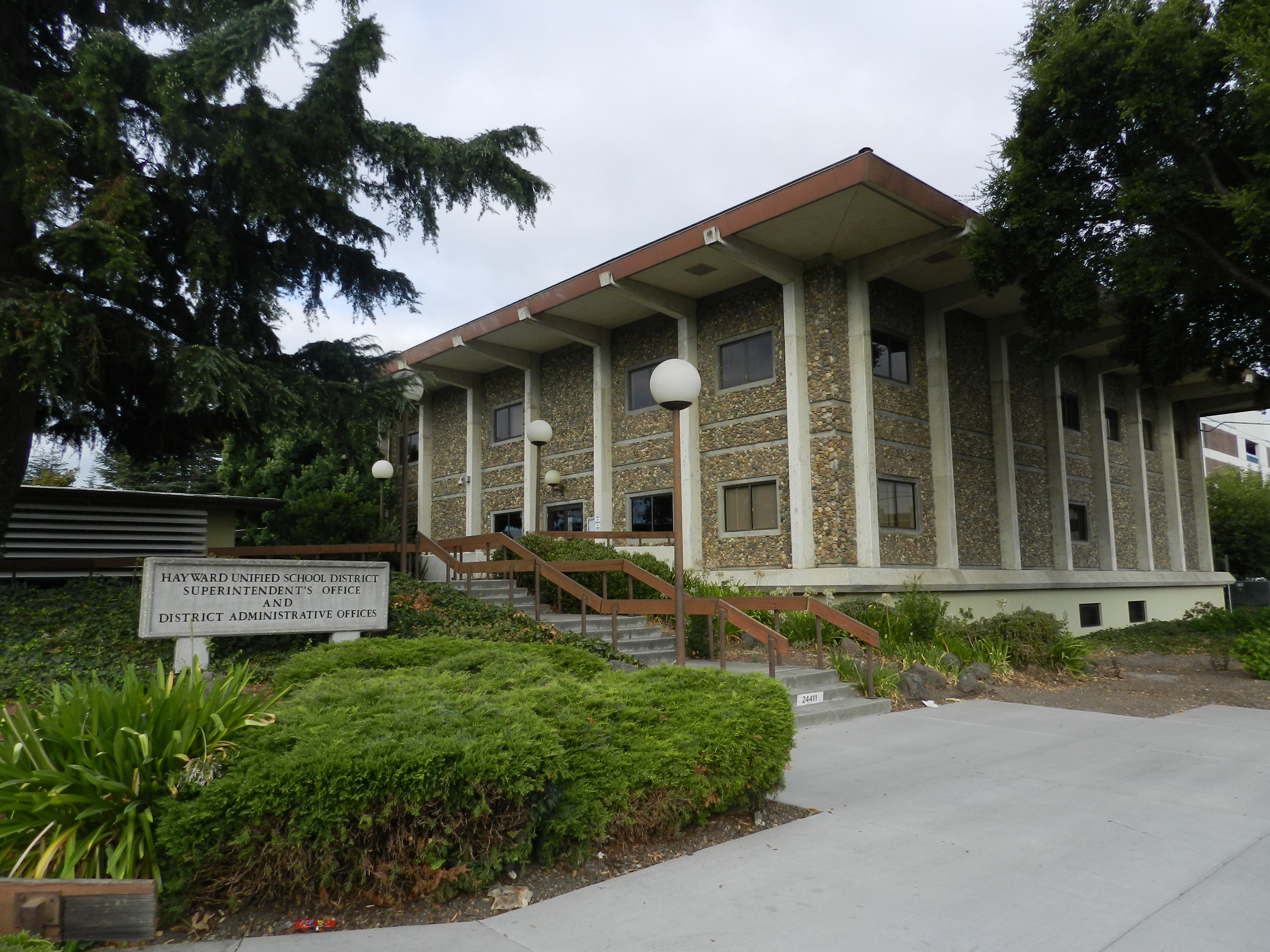
HUSD administrative offices, adjacent to the Hayward Hall of Justice

The Hayward Unified School District (HUSD) is a public school district serving the city of Hayward, California, in Alameda County, in the United States. Supervised by the superintendent and the HUSD board of trustees, the district serves about 21,000 students in 30 schools, and employs more than 950 teachers. The current Superintendent is Chien Wu-Fernandez, and the current Board of Education president is Peter Bufete. Chien Wu-Fernandez was appointed by the Board of Education to become the next Superintendent on March 26, 2025, following the resignation of Dr. Jason Reimann.

== Boundary ==
The district serves the majority of Hayward, most of Fairview and portions of Castro Valley and Cherryland.

== History ==
=== 2007 strike ===
In April 2007, Hayward teachers went on strike for ten days.

The teachers, counselors and nurses, represented by the Hayward Education Association (HEA), were upset over a 16% raise given to two district administrators in summer 2006. Negotiations broke down, with the HEA asking for an 8.08% retroactive raise initially, reaching 16% after 2 years, and the district offering a one time 5.5% raise (one source stating 7%) with possible subsequent increases of 1.6%, which was rejected. The district offered an additional one time 3% bonus, which was also rejected. The district had come out of receivership in 2005, and the administration was concerned about the district going back into the red. Teachers cited the administrator's raises as evidence the district undervalued teachers and might be hiding money that could be applied to teacher salaries.

The strike commenced on 5 April 2007, with only 45 of approximately 900 teachers showing up to work, with the balance appearing in picket lines. District administrator Dale Vigil initially dismissed the strike effects, but after a week of the strike, Vigil looked to file an injunction against the HEA, to force the teachers back into classrooms. Vigil was confronted at one point by angry strikers, who pounded on his car and pushed him.

Only 4,100 of approximately 22,000 district students showed up for classes the first day of the strike. 29 schools were affected initially.

Farm Workers Union founder and activist Dolores Huerta showed up to support the striking teachers. Local TV and newspaper outlets covered the story.

The strike ended in a tentative agreement on 25 April 2007, when Vigil announced the settlement during a regular school board meeting. Teachers voted to pass the agreement detailing an 11% raise over the next two years, the following day, as classes resumed.

=== 2008–present ===
In 2008, the district passed the Measure I school funding bond, the first bond measure in Hayward in over 45 years. The measure passed with 72% of the vote.

== Hayward Education Association ==
The Hayward Education Association (HEA) is one of the recognized employee organizations for negotiating collective bargaining rights with HUSD. HEA organized a strike in April 2007 against HUSD, the Hayward teachers strike.

== Schools ==
The district operates 25 elementary schools, five middle schools, and three high schools. It also maintains an alternative high school, an English language center, and an adult education center. Many of the park and recreation facilities at the schools are managed by the Hayward Area Recreation and Park District.

=== Secondary schools ===
==== High schools ====
- Hayward High School
- Mount Eden High School
- Tennyson High School

==== Alternative schools ====
- Brenkwitz High School, a continuation high school, named after Thomas N. Brenkwitz

==== Middle schools ====
HUSD operates five middle schools.

- Anthony W. Ochoa serves west Hayward.
- Bret Harte serves the Downtown Hayward and northern hills area.
- Cesar Chavez serves the Fairway Park and southern hills area.
- Martin Luther King Jr. serves the Mount Eden area.
- Winton serves the Burbank and Santa Clara neighborhoods.

=== Elementary schools ===
- Burbank Elem.
- Cherryland
- East Avenue
- Eden Gardens
- Eldridge
- Fairview
- Faith Ringgold School (K-8)
- Glassbrook
- Harder
- Longwood
- Lorin A. Eden
- Palma Ceia
- Park
- Ruus
- Schafer Park
- Southgate
- Stonebrae
- Treeview/Bidwell
- Tyrrell

== Former schools ==
=== High schools ===
- Sunset High School

=== Elementary schools ===
- Bowman Elementary School closed in 2022.
- Strobridge Elementary School closed in 2022.
- Edwin Markham School closed in June 2009; Faith Ringgold School now occupies its campus.
- John Muir Elementary School closed in June 2008.
- Shepherd Elementary School Closed in June 2007 (SIAC Center 27211 Tyrrell Avenue)
- Highland Elementary School closed in June 2006.
- Argonaut Elementary School closed in June 1977.

== See also ==
- New Haven Unified School District, with one high school located within Hayward city limits
- List of high schools in California
