= East Bay Arts High School =

Location
- 50 E Lewelling Blvd. San Lorenzo, California; United States; 37.68681°N 122.11582°W

Information
- Type: Public
- Established: 2005
- Closed: 2026
- School district: San Lorenzo Unified School District
- Principal: Alexander Harp (last)
- Staff: 9.07 (FTE)
- Grades: 9-12
- Enrollment: 133 (2023-2024)
- Student to teacher ratio: 14.66
- Campus: Urban
- Colors: Purple and Gold
- Website: https://eba.slzusd.org/

East Bay Arts High School was a public high school located in San Lorenzo, California and was part of the San Lorenzo Unified School District.

== History ==
Historically, there were many processes of possible closure related to East Bay Arts due to low student population. East Bay Arts ultimately closed in 2026 despite multiple protests.

== Arts programs ==
Per its name, East Bay Arts High School is most well known by its college preparatory arts programs.
Art
The "Art" Department consisted of the following courses: Drawing and Painting, Photography, and Theater.
Dance
The "Dance" Department consisted of the following courses: Hip Hop, and Ballet Folklorico which maintained focus on folk dances and historical choreography.
Music
The Music Department consisted of the following courses: Digital Music, Choral, and the Symphonic Chamber Orchestra conducted by the school's string specialist.

== Expressions ==
The school also had a yearly project called "expressions" which was one of its quarterly projects that required all students to create an art project related to the determined theme for the year. These could be live performances as well as visual arts or creative writing. When it was time for artwork to be presented for all the school to see, an entire day was dedicated to the event in which students observed the works of everyone else.

== See also ==
- Alameda County High Schools
- San Lorenzo Unified School District
