= San Lorenzo High School =

Coordinates: 37°41′13.38″N 122°7′18.77″W

Location
- 50 East Lewelling Boulevard; San Lorenzo, California 94588; United States

Information
- Type: Public high school
- Established: January 24, 1950
- School district: San Lorenzo Unified School District
- Principal: Brock Ahrens
- Teaching staff: 49.65 (FTE)
- Grades: 9-12
- Enrollment: 1,029 (2024-2025)
- Student to teacher ratio: 20.73
- Campus: Urban
- Colors: Maroon, White, and Gold Freshmen: Sophomores: Juniors: Seniors:
- Athletics conference: CIF NCS
- Mascot: Grizzlies
- Website: San Lorenzo High School Homepage

San Lorenzo High School, also known as "SLZ", is a public high school located in San Lorenzo, California, and is part of the San Lorenzo Unified School District.

The school's student body reflects the diversity of its surrounding and nearby communities, namely San Lorenzo, San Leandro, Hayward, and Oakland. As of the 2018-2019 school year, the student demographics are, Hispanic-Latino (62%), followed by Asian (15%), Black (14%), non-Hispanic White (5%), Pacific Islander (2%), American Indian or Alaska Native (less than 1%), and two or more races (2%).

== Academics ==
San Lorenzo High School includes two academies in partnership with the California Partnership Academies program:

- Law Leadership and Culture (LLC) - for students interested in the law, in how societies and language develop and change over time, and about how students impact the world in a positive way.
- Bay Area Digital Arts (BADA) - an academy which covers all the regular subjects while teaching skills in digital arts. Students participate in various visual/performing arts classes and their learning is enhanced through creativity.

San Lorenzo students are also able to enroll in Advanced Placement and Honors courses such as AP Government, AP US History, AP Psychology, AP Calculus, and AP English (Literature as well as Language Composition).

== Notable alumni ==
- Zinzi Coogler, Oscar-nominated film producer
- Pauline Russo Cutter, Former Mayor of San Leandro, California
- Manny Fernandez, former NFL defensive tackle. Two-time Super Bowl champion with the Miami Dolphins
- Nonito Donaire, boxer, former World Bantamweight Champion
- Ruby Ibarra, rapper
- John Ralston, College Football Hall of Fame Football Head Coach
- Steve Smith, singer
- Jerry Smith, former NFL tight end. Two-time Pro Bowl selection with the Washington Redskins
