= Dell Demps =

American professional basketball executive and former player

Minnesota Timberwolves
- Title: Front office assistant
- League: NBA

Personal information
- Born: February 12, 1970 (age 56) Long Beach, California, U.S.
- Listed height: 6 ft 3 in (1.91 m)
- Listed weight: 205 lb (93 kg)

Career information
- High school: Mount Eden (Hayward, California)
- College: Pacific (1988–1992)
- NBA draft: 1992: undrafted
- Playing career: 1992–2000
- Position: Point guard / shooting guard
- Number: 20, 5
- Coaching career: 2001–2003, 2020–2022

Career history

Playing
- 1992: 7-Up Uncolas
- 1992–1993: Yakima Sun Kings
- 1993: Oklahoma City Cavalry
- 1993: Rochester Renegade
- 1993: Golden State Warriors
- 1993–1994: Yakima Sun Kings
- 1994: Shell Rimula-X
- 1994: SLUC Nancy Basket
- 1994–1995: Yakima Sun Kings
- 1995–1996: San Antonio Spurs
- 1996: Orlando Magic
- 1996–1997: Yakima Sun Kings
- 1997: P.A.O.K.
- 1998: Yakima Sun Kings
- 1998–1999: Cibona Zagreb
- 1999–2000: Trenton Shooting Stars
- 2000: Galatasaray

Coaching
- 2001–2003: Mobile Revelers (assistant)
- 2020–2022: Utah Jazz (assistant)

Career highlights
- As player: CBA champion (1995); Croatian Cup winner (1999); First-team All-Big West (1992); No. 5 retired by Pacific Tigers; As assistant coach: NBDL champion (2003)
- Stats at NBA.com
- Stats at Basketball Reference

Delano Demps (born February 12, 1970) is an American professional basketball executive and former player who is a front office assistant for the Minnesota Timberwolves of the National Basketball Association (NBA). He previously served as an assistant coach for the Utah Jazz and the general manager of the New Orleans Hornets/Pelicans from 2010 to 2019. Demps played in the NBA for the Golden State Warriors, San Antonio Spurs and Orlando Magic after a college basketball career with the Pacific Tigers.

He also played internationally in France, Greece, Croatia, Turkey and the Philippines. He played with Shell and 7-Up.

== Post-playing career ==
After his playing career, Demps spent two seasons as an assistant coach for the Mobile Revelers of the National Basketball Development League and won a championship in 2003. He joined the New York Knicks as a scout in 2003. Demps was hired by the San Antonio Spurs as the director of professional player personnel in 2005 where he spent five seasons. He additionally served as the general manager of the Austin Toros for three years during that time.

On July 21, 2010, Demps was named as general manager of the New Orleans Hornets.

On September 25, 2020, Demps was hired by the Utah Jazz as an assistant coach.

Demps joined the basketball operations staff of the Minnesota Timberwolves in 2022.

== Personal life ==
Born in Long Beach, California, Demps played high school basketball for Mt. Eden High School in Hayward, California. Demps is married to attorney Anita Demps and the couple has three children. His son, Tre, played college basketball for the Northwestern Wildcats from 2011 to 2016, and currently works as a basketball analyst. His son, Jourdan, attended the University of San Francisco. His youngest son, Riley Demps, played college basketball at New York University from 2018 to 2022, and currently works for the Utah Jazz.
