= Mt. Eden High School =

Location
- 2300 Panama Street; Hayward, California 94545; United States; 37°37′30″N 122°5′26″W

Information
- Type: Public high school
- Motto: "You can't hide that Monarch Pride!"
- Established: 1960
- School district: Hayward Unified School District
- Principal: Monique Walton
- Teaching staff: 91.29 (FTE)
- Grades: 9–12
- Enrollment: 1,865 (2024–2025)
- Student to teacher ratio: 21.89
- Colors: Royal blue and gold
- Nickname: Monarchs
- API average: 699 (2012–2013)
- Newspaper: The Lion's Tale
- Yearbook: The Scepter
- Website: Mt. Eden High School website

Mt. Eden High School is a public high school in Hayward, California, United States, founded in 1960. It is part of the Hayward Unified School District. Mt. Eden High is located in southwest Hayward, near Union City.

== Athletics ==
Sports offered at Mt. Eden are:

- Cross country
- Football
- Tennis
- Volleyball
- Swim
- Basketball
- Soccer
- Wrestling
- Baseball
- Badminton
- Softball
- Track & field
- Cheerleading
- Golf

== Notable alumni ==
- Dell Demps – NBA guard and general manager
- Charlton Jimerson – MLB baseball player
- Spice 1 – rapper
- Mahershala Ali – actor
- George Mitterwald – baseball player
- James Monroe Iglehart – Tony Award winning Broadway actor, who played the Genie in Aladdin and starred in Hamilton
- Esa Pole – NFL offensive tackle for the Kansas City Chiefs
- Dick Tidrow – MLB pitcher for the New York Yankees, Senior Vice President of Player Personnel for the San Francisco Giants
