= San Lorenzo Unified School District =

School district in California, United States

Address
- 15510 Usher St. San Lorenzo, California 94580 United States

District information
- Type: Public school district
- Motto: Ensuring Equitable Opportunities and Outcomes for ALL Students
- Grades: K-12
- Established: 1859
- Superintendent: Daryl F. Camp
- Asst. superintendent(s): Roberto Perez (Business Services), Renee Lama (Educational Services), Jessica Saavedra (Human Resources)
- NCES District ID: 0634710

Students and staff
- Students: 8,116
- Teachers: 518

Other information
- Teachers' unions: San Lorenzo Education Association (SLEA), California Teachers Association
- Website: Official website

San Lorenzo Unified School District is a school district in Alameda County, California, serving the CDP of San Lorenzo and portions of the cities of Hayward and San Leandro and the CDPs of Ashland, Castro Valley and Cherryland. It was established in 1859, making it one of the oldest continuously operating school systems in the State of California.

Several "small learning communities," each with a distinctive program, have been created at the district's three high school campuses to better serve students. Superintendent Daryl F. Camp is the 9th Superintendent in the history of the district. Student population is approx. 9,812.

== History ==
Beginning in 1850 with only six students and a tiny portable schoolhouse that it shared with Hayward, the District reached its peak size in 1970 with 18,000 students enrolled in 28 schools. The members of the first School Board, organized in 1864, were William Meek, John Lewelling, and A. E. Crane. Meek was the owner of the now historic Meek Mansion in Hayward.

In 1902 the original school building was replaced by a two-story wood structure, which in 1928 was destroyed by an arsonist. Its replacement, a two-story brick building, was quickly built in 1929 but was declared unsafe for students in 1952 because it was not earthquake-proof and had no fire escape. The district administration then occupied the building until the new District Office was built in 1972. As more homes replaced the agricultural land, more schools were built. San Lorenzo High and Arroyo High were part of the Hayward Union High School District until 1963, when San Lorenzo became a Unified School District. (Marina High School was built in 1964, closed in 1983).

== Board of education ==
The Board of Education consists of 6 members in total. 5 are elected to 4-year terms at-large and are the voting members of the Board, and 1 (the Student Board Trustee) is appointed by the sitting Board of Education and is entitled to an emblematic vote.

Governing	Non-Voting (or Emblematic Voter)
Juan Campos, President; Kyla Sinegal, Vice President/Clerk; Alicia Gonzalez, Board Member; Dorothy Lee, Board Member; Samuel Medina, Board Member	Daryl F. Camp, Ed.D., Superintendent; Camila Araya-Guizar, Student Trustee; Faris Eltaki, Student Trustee; Zahara Safiq, Student Trustee

== Schools ==
There are 18 total schools in San Lorenzo Unified School District, of which there are 5 high schools, 4 middle schools, and 9 elementary schools totaling to a student population of 9,812.

High Schools	Middle Schools	Elementary Schools
Arroyo High School; Royal Sunset High School; San Lorenzo High School; East Bay Arts High School (Closed); Marina High School (Closed)	Bohannon Middle School; Edendale Middle School; Washington Manor Middle School	Bay Elementary School; Colonial Acres Elementary School; Corvallis Elementary School; Dayton Elementary School; Del Rey Elementary School; Grant Elementary School; Hesperian Elementary School; Hillside Elementary School; Lorenzo Manor Elementary School

=== Small Learning Communities (SLCs) ===
Circa 2004, SLZUSD made a request-for-proposals to create small, thematic academies as "schools-within-schools." These Small Learning Communities (SLC) are designed to house no more than 400 students each. The program has doubled from four initial academies to a full menu of Small Learning Communities:

- Bay Area Digital Arts (SLz campus)
- East Bay Arts (Ebarts campus)
- Futures Academy (AYO campus)
- Green Engineering & Technology (SLz campus)
- Health and Medicine Academy (AYO campus)
- Law, Leadership & Culture (SLz campus)
- Tech-Links Academy (AYO campus)
- TREND Academy (AYO campus)
