= Arroyo High School (San Lorenzo, California) =

Coordinates: 37.680415°N 122.139253°W

Location
- 15701 Lorenzo Ave. San Lorenzo, California; United States

Information
- Type: Public high school
- Established: 1954
- School district: San Lorenzo Unified School District
- Principal: Megan Miller
- Staff: 61.81 (FTE)
- Grades: 9-12
- Enrollment: 1,542 (2023-2024)
- Student to teacher ratio: 24.95
- Colors: Red, black, and white
- Mascot: Don
- Website: ahs.slzusd.org

Arroyo High School is a public high school located in San Lorenzo, California, and is part of the San Lorenzo Unified School District.

== Small Learning Communities ==
The school includes four academies in partnership with the California Partnership Academies program.

- Academy of Health and Medicine. (An academy designed for students who want to go into the health field.)
- Future Leaders for Social Change Academy. (Futures academy teaches students to become critical thinkers and to become a leader.)
- Tech-Links Academy. (Tech Links offers a rigorous, relevant, business and technology curriculum that prepares students for post-high school college and career opportunities.)
- Trend Academy. (The TREND Academy provides students with the opportunity to step into the role of an engineer and or Industrial Designer, adopt a problem-solving mindset, engage in the engineering design process, and climatically make the leap from visionaries to doers.)

These four CPAs are also called Small Learning Communities (SLCs).

== Demographics ==
In the 2023–2024 school year, there were 1,542 students. 48.3% (745) identified as Hispanic, 32.7% (504) identified as Asian, 8.0% (123) identified as White, 5.1% (79) identified as Black, 3.4% (52) identified as two or more races, 1.9% (29) identified as Native Hawaiian or Pacific Islander, and 0.5% (7) identified as American Indian or Alaskan Native.

== Notable alumni ==
- Damian Lillard, NBA point guard
- Chris Ward, former MLB Player (Chicago Cubs)
- Chelsea Spencer, Head Coach - Softball (UC Berkeley)

== See also ==
- Alameda County High Schools
