= Maxine Hong Kingston =

Chinese American author and teacher (born 1940)

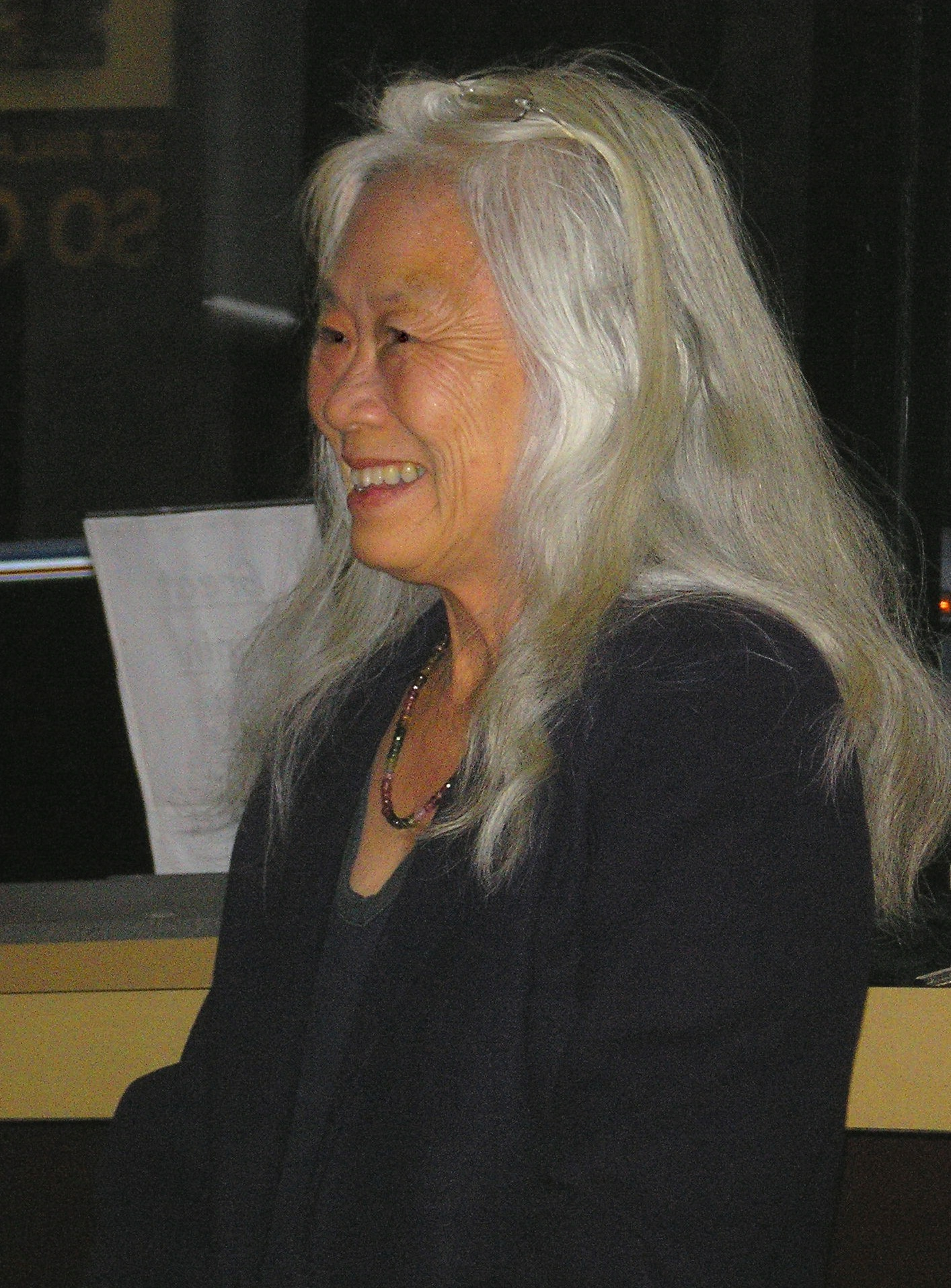
- Kingston in 2006
- Born: Maxine Ting Ting Hong; October 27, 1940 (age 85); Stockton, California, U.S.
- Education: University of California, Berkeley (BA)
- Occupation: Novelist
- Spouse: Earll Kingston (m. 1962)
- Children: 1
- Writing career
- Notable works: The Woman Warrior (1976), China Men (1980), Tripmaster Monkey (1989), The Fifth Book of Peace (2003)
- Notable awards: National Book Critics Circle Award; National Book Award; National Humanities Medal; National Medal of Arts

Maxine Hong Kingston
- Traditional Chinese: 湯亭亭
- Simplified Chinese: 汤亭亭
Transcriptions
Standard Mandarin
- Hanyu Pinyin: Tāng Tíngtíng
- Wade–Giles: T'ang T'ingt'ing
- IPA: [tʰáŋ tʰǐŋtʰǐŋ]
Yue: Cantonese
- Jyutping: Tong Ting-ting

Maxine Hong Kingston (Chinese: 湯婷婷; born Maxine Ting Ting Hong; October 27, 1940) is an American novelist. She is a professor emerita at the University of California, Berkeley, where she graduated in 1962 with a B.A. degree in English. Kingston has written three novels and several works of non-fiction about the experiences of Chinese Americans.

Kingston has contributed to the feminist movement with such works as her memoir The Woman Warrior, which discusses gender and ethnicity and how these concepts affect the lives of women. She has received several awards for her contributions to Chinese American literature, including the National Book Award for Nonfiction in 1981 for China Men. (Note: This was the award for hardcover "General Nonfiction". From 1980 to 1983 in National Book Awards history there were several nonfiction subcategories including General Nonfiction, with dual hardcover and paperback awards in most categories.)

Kingston has received significant criticism for reinforcing racist stereotypes in her work and for fictionalizing traditional Chinese stories in order to appeal to Western perceptions of Chinese people. She has also garnered criticism from female Asian scholars for her "'over-exaggeration' of Asian American female oppression".

== Life and career ==
Kingston was born Maxine Ting Ting Hong on October 27, 1940, in Stockton, California, to first-generation Chinese immigrants parents: her father, Tom Hong (d. 1991) and her mother, Ying Lan Chew. She was the third of eight children and the oldest of the six born in the United States.

In China, Tom Hong worked as a professional scholar and teacher in his home village of Sun Woi, near Canton. In 1925, Hong left China for the United States in search of better prospects. However, the Chinese Exclusion Act of 1882—a xenophobic response to the influx of Chinese workers in the 19th century—was still in effect, preventing Hong from legally entering the United States. He attempted to enter from Cuba twice before finally succeeding in 1927.

Furthermore, early-20th-century U.S. employment laws were rife with racism, leaving little interest in hiring a well-educated Chinese immigrant. Hong had been a scholar in his home village of Sun Woi, near Canton. However, in America, Hong was limited to working menial jobs - washing windows and doing laundry. He saved his earnings and became the manager of an illegal gambling house, which led him to get arrested numerous times. Hong "was canny about his arrests, never giving his real name and—because he apparently sensed that quite a few people thought that all Chinese looked alike—inventing a different name for each arrest. Consequently, he never acquired a police record in his own name." Hong was able to bring his wife over in 1939. During the fifteen years they were separated, Kingston's mother, Chew, had studied Western medicine and become a doctor. Yet in Stockton, she was just another immigrant.

Shortly thereafter, Kingston was born; she was named "Maxine" after a blonde patron at the gambling house who was always remarkably lucky. Kingston, a quiet child, did not learn English until the age of five. She recalls an I.Q. test once recording her score as zero. Asked to paint a picture for class, she presented a black sheet, representing stage curtains before a show. Her earliest memories are of World War II—cousins in uniform. Fascinated by war and soldiers, she grew up hearing her mother recount China's history as a continuous cycle of conquest and conflict: “We were always losers. We were always on the run.”

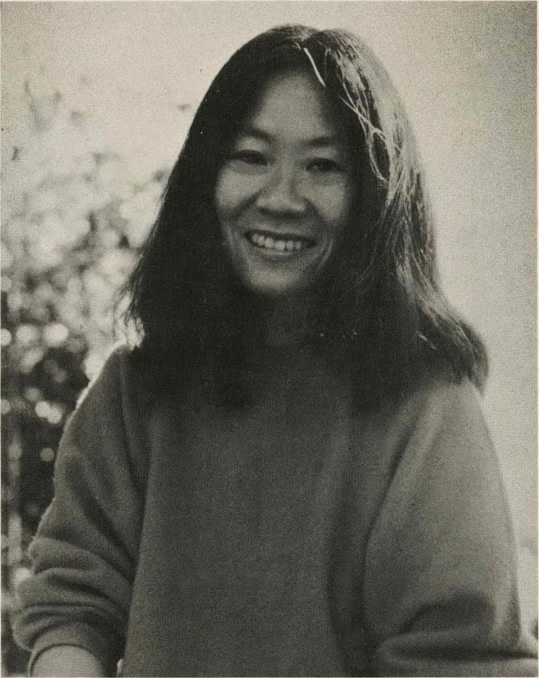
Kingston c. 1976

At a young age, Kingston was drawn to writing and won a five-dollar prize from Girl Scout Magazine for an essay she wrote titled "I Am an American". She majored in engineering at University of California, Berkeley, before switching to English. She met her husband, actor Earll Kingston, while they were both students at Berkeley, and they married in 1962. Kingston then began her career as a high-school teacher.

Their son, Joseph Lawrence Chung Mei, was born in 1963. From 1965 to 1967, Maxine taught English and mathematics at Sunset High School in Hayward, California. After relocating to Hawaii, her boredom in a lonely hotel 80 miles north of Oahu caused Maxine to begin writing extensively, finally completing and publishing her first book, The Woman Warrior: Memoir of a Girlhood Among Ghosts, in 1976. She began teaching English at the University of Hawaiʻi at Mānoa that same year. By 1981 she had moved on to teach at Berkeley.

Her writing often reflects on her cultural heritage and blends fiction with non-fiction. Among her works are The Woman Warrior (1976), awarded the National Book Critics Circle Award for Nonfiction, and China Men (1980), awarded the National Book Award for Nonfiction. She has written one novel, Tripmaster Monkey, a story depicting a protagonist based on the mythical Chinese character Sun Wu Kong. Subsequent books include To Be the Poet and The Fifth Book of Peace.

A public television documentary produced by Joan Saffa, Stephen Talbot and Gayle K. Yamada, Maxine Hong Kingston: Talking Story, was released in 1990. Narrated by actor BD Wong and featuring notable Asian-American authors such as Amy Tan and David Henry Hwang, it explored Kingston's life, paying particular attention to her commentary on cultural heritage and both sexual and racial oppression. The production was awarded the CINE Golden Eagle in 1990. Kingston also participated in the production of Bill Moyers' PBS historical documentary, Becoming American: The Chinese Experience.

Kingston was awarded the 1997 National Humanities Medal by President of the United States Bill Clinton. She was a member of the committee to choose the design for the California commemorative quarter.

In 2003, Kingston was arrested in Washington, D.C., while protesting against the impending Iraq War. The protest, which took place on International Women's Day (March 8), was coordinated by the women-initiated organization Code Pink. Kingston refused to leave the street after being instructed to do so by local police forces. She shared a jail cell with authors Alice Walker and Terry Tempest Williams, who were also participants in the demonstration. Kingston's anti-war stance has significantly trickled into her work; she has stated that writing The Fifth Book of Peace was initiated and inspired by growing up during World War II.

Kingston was honored as a 175th Speaker Series writer at Emma Willard School in September 2005. In April, 2007, Kingston was awarded the Northern California Book Award Special Award in Publishing for Veterans of War, Veterans of Peace (2006), an anthology that she edited.

In July, 2014, Kingston was awarded the 2013 National Medal of Arts by President of the United States Barack Obama. In Spring 2023, Kingston was awarded the Emerson-Thoreau Medal for distinguished achievement in the field of literature by the American Academy of Arts and Sciences

She currently resides in Oakland, California, where she is retired and maintains her garden.

== Influences ==
In an interview published in American Literary History, Kingston disclosed her admiration for Walt Whitman, Virginia Woolf, and William Carlos Williams, who were inspirational influences for her work, shaping her analysis of gender studies. Kingston said of Walt Whitman's work:

I like the rhythm of his language and the freedom and the wildness of it. It's so American. And also his vision of a new kind of human being that was going to be formed in this country—although he never specifically said Chinese—ethnic Chinese also—I'd like to think he meant all kinds of people. And also I love that throughout Leaves of Grass he always says 'men and women,' 'male and female.' He's so different from other writers of his time, and even of this time. Even a hundred years ago he included women and he always used [those phrases], 'men and women,' 'male and female.'

Kingston named the main character of Tripmaster Monkey (1989) Wittman Ah Sing, after Walt Whitman.

Of Woolf, Kingston stated:

I found that whenever I come to a low point in my life or in my work, when I read Virginia Woolf's Orlando, that always seems to get my life force moving again. I just love the way she can make one character live for four hundred years, and that Orlando can be a man. Orlando can be a woman. Virginia broke through constraints of time, of gender, of culture.

Similarly, Kingston's praise of William Carlos Williams expresses her appreciation of his seemingly genderless work:

I love In the American Grain because it does the same thing. Abraham Lincoln is a 'mother' of our country. He talks about this wonderful woman walking through the battlefields with her beard and shawl. I find that so freeing, that we don't have to be constrained to being just one ethnic group or one gender – both [Woolf and Williams] make me feel that I can now write as a man, I can write as a black person, as a white person; I don't have to be restricted by time and physicality.

== Criticism ==
Though Kingston's work is acclaimed by some, it has also received negative criticism, especially from some members of the Chinese American community. Playwright and novelist Frank Chin has severely criticized Kingston's The Woman Warrior, stating that Kingston deliberately tarnished the authenticity of Chinese tradition by altering traditional stories and myths to appeal to white sensitivities. Chin has accused Kingston of "liberally adapting [traditional stories] to collude with white racist stereotypes and to invent a 'fake' Chinese-American culture that is more palatable to the mainstream."

Kingston commented on her critics' opinions in a 1990 interview in which she stated that men believe that minority women writers have "achieved success by collaborating with the white racist establishment," by "pander[ing] to the white taste for feminist writing... It's a one-sided argument because the women don't answer. We let them say those things because we don't want to be divisive."

However, several female Asian scholars have also criticized Kingston's work. Shirley Geok-lin Lim, a professor of English at the University of California, Santa Barbara, stated that Kingston's "representations of patriarchal, abusive Chinese history were playing to a desire to look at Asians as an inferior spectacle". Writer Katheryn M. Fong took exception to Kingston's "distortion of the histories of China and Chinese America" and denounced Kingston for her "over-exaggerated" depiction of Chinese and Chinese American cultural misogyny. "The problem is that non-Chinese are reading [Kingston's] fiction as true accounts of Chinese and Chinese American history," wrote Fong, who noted that her own father "was very loving" towards her.

== Recognition ==
=== Literary prize ===
Year	Title	Award	Category	Result	Ref.
1976	The Woman Warrior	National Book Critics Circle Award	General Nonfiction	Won	
1978	The Woman Warrior	Anisfield-Wolf Book Award	Nonfiction	Won	
1980	China Men	National Book Award	General Nonfiction (Hardcover)	Won	
1980	China Men	National Book Critics Circle Award	General Nonfiction	Finalist	
1981	China Men	Pulitzer Prize	General Non-Fiction	Finalist	
1989	Tripmaster Monkey	PEN West Award for Fiction	Fiction/Novel	Won	

=== Awards ===
- National Endowment for the Arts Writers Award, 1980
- National Endowment for the Arts Writers Award, 1982
- National Humanities Medal, 1997
- Lifetime Achievement Award from the Asian American Literary Awards, 2006
- Medal for Distinguished Contribution to American Letters from the National Book Foundation, 2008
- Fitzgerald Award for Achievement in American Literature Award, 2011
- National Medal of Arts, 2013Emerson-Thoreau Medal

== Selected works ==
- "No Name Woman" (essay), 1975
- The Woman Warrior: Memoirs of a Girlhood among Ghosts, 1976
- China Men, Knopf, 1980
- Hawai'i One Summer, 1987
- Through the Black Curtain, 1987
- Tripmaster Monkey: His Fake Book, 1989
- To Be the Poet, 2002
- The Fifth Book of Peace, 2003
- Veterans of War, Veterans of Peace, 2006
- I Love a Broad Margin to My Life, 2011

== Literature ==
- Viet Thanh Nguyen: The woman warrior, China men, Tripmaster monkey, Hawai'i one summer, other writings, New York: The Library of America, 2022, ISBN 978-1-59853-724-6
