= Department of plant and microbial biology =

Department of the University of California

The department of plant and microbial biology is an academic department in the Rausser College of Natural Resources at the University of California, Berkeley. The department conducts extensive research, provides undergraduate and graduate programs, and educates students in the fields of plant and microbial sciences with 43 department faculty members.

Students in the undergraduate division graduate with a Bachelor of Science. The Graduate division offers Ph.D. degrees and opportunities for students to participate in postdoctoral research.

The department headquarters along with many faculty offices and laboratories are located in Koshland Hall. The Biological Imaging Facility, in Koshland Hall provides instructional and research support for modern biological light microscopy including laser scanning, confocal and deconvolution microscopy, computer image processing and analysis, FISH, and immunolocalization. The Genetics and Plant Biology building, situated on the northwest side of the campus, was built in 1999. It is the main teaching site for lectures and laboratory courses offered by the plant and microbial biology department.

Research strengths in the plant and microbial biology department are in the areas of plant and microbial genetics, biochemistry, ecology, evolution, pathology, development, physiology, cell biology and molecular biology. The department grants undergraduate degrees in: microbial biology, genetics and plant biology. Graduate degrees are offered in microbiology and plant biology. Many faculty in the department conduct research on plant-microbe interactions. The faculty and graduate students also cooperate with faculty from other UC Berkeley departments, such as the molecular and cell biology department, on researches pertaining to plant genetics and microbial biology.

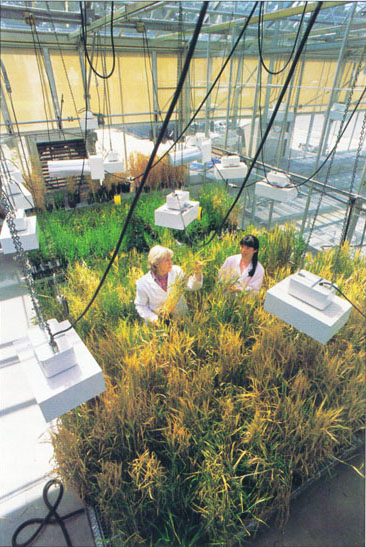
Faculty and Graduate student working in PGEC's greenhouse

.
