= Royal Sunset High School =

High school in California, United States

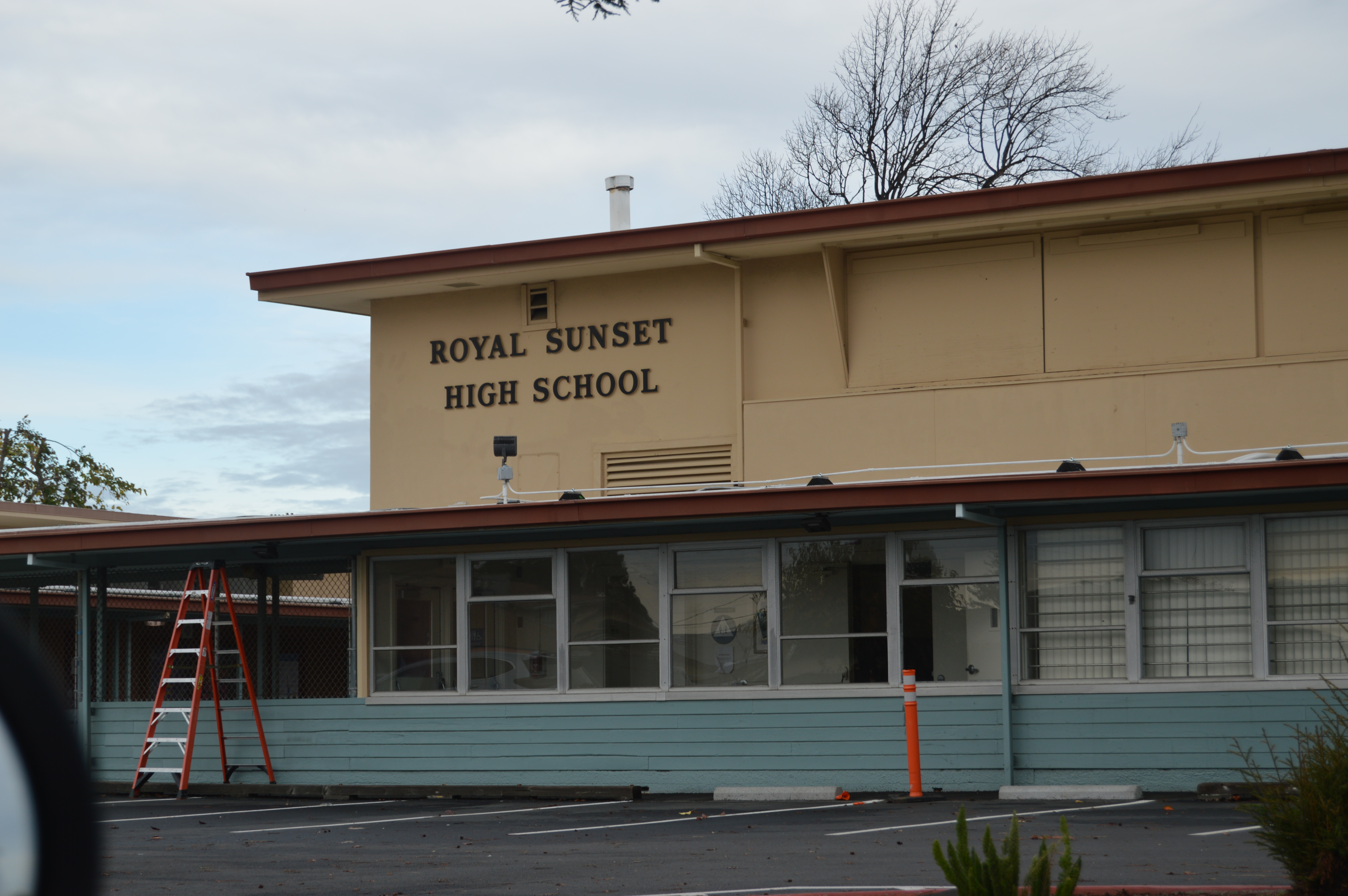

Location
- Hayward, California; United States; 37°40′09″N 122°06′52″W

Information
- School district: San Lorenzo Unified School District
- Website: rhs.slzusd.org

Royal Sunset High School is a continuation high school in Hayward, California, United States, and is part of the San Lorenzo Unified School District.
