= The Woman Warrior =

1976 book by Maxine Hong Kingston

The Woman Warrior: Memoirs of a Girlhood among Ghosts
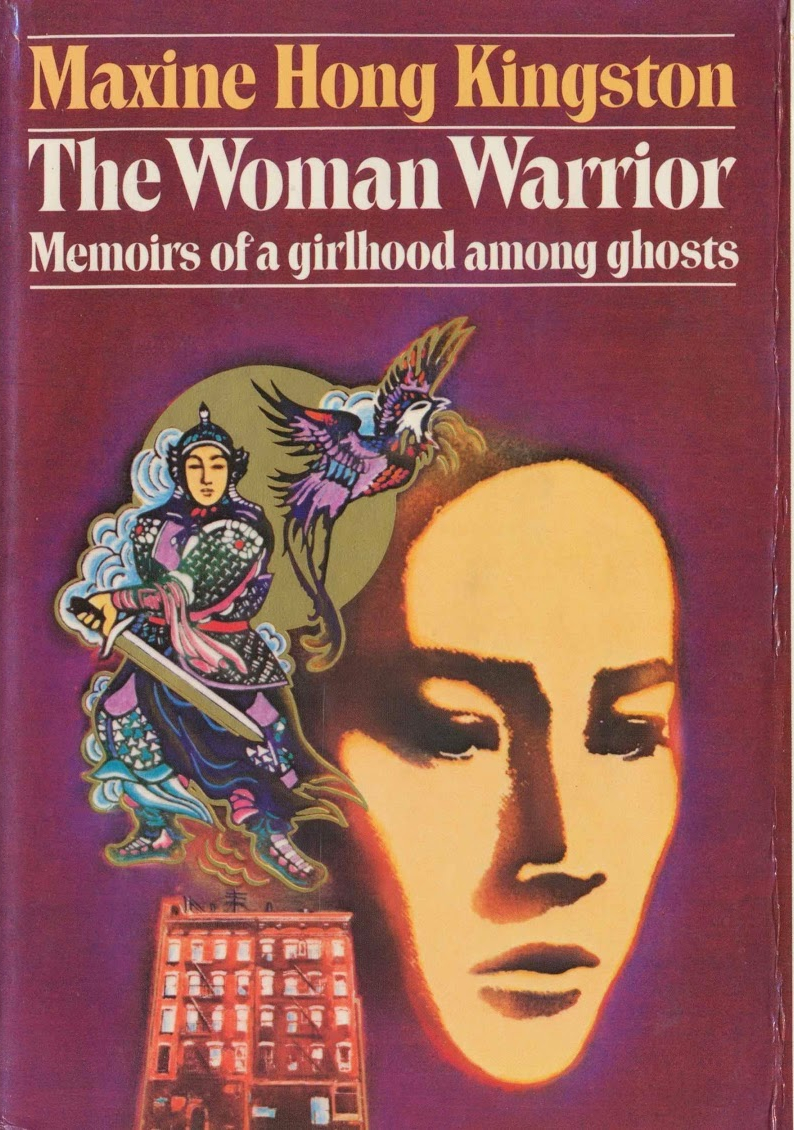
- First edition
- Author: Maxine Hong Kingston
- Language: English
- Genre: memoir, autobiography, Chinese folk tale
- Publisher: Knopf
- Publication date: 1976
- Publication place: United States
- Media type: Print (hardback & paperback)
- Pages: 209
- ISBN: 0-679-72188-6
- OCLC: 19756897
- Dewey Decimal: 979.4/053/092 B 22
- LC Class: CT275.K5764 A33 1989

The Woman Warrior: Memoirs of a Girlhood Among Ghosts is a book written by Chinese American author Maxine Hong Kingston and published by Alfred A. Knopf in 1976. The book blends autobiography with old Chinese folktales.

The Woman Warrior won the National Book Critics Circle Award and was named one of TIME magazine's top nonfiction books of the 1970s.

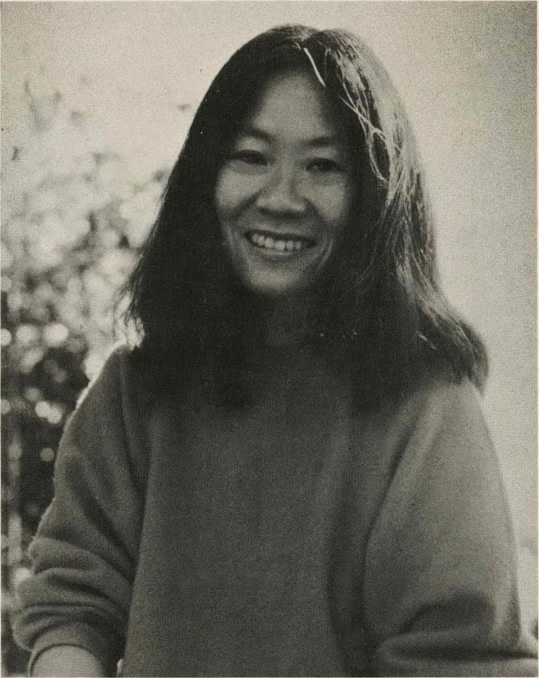
Kingston in c. 1976

== Genre ==
The specific genre of The Woman Warrior has been disputed due to Kingston's blend of perspectives, specifically traditional Chinese folktale and memoir. With this mixture, Kingston tries to provide her audience with the cultural, familial, and personal context needed to understand her unique position as a first-generation Chinese-American woman.

Susan Stanford Friedman's assessment of autobiography with regard to women and minority groups explains Kingston's intricate blend of perspective and genre: women and cultural minorities often don't have the privilege of viewing themselves as individuals isolated from their gender or racial group. Kingston illustrates this condition through her use of Chinese talk-story, her mother's traditional Chinese perspective, and her own first-person view as a Chinese American.

== Plot summary ==
The book is divided into five interconnected chapters, which read like short stories.

=== "No-Name Woman" ===
In the first part of this chapter, the narrator is recounting how her mother once told her the story of the No-Name Woman. The chapter essentially opens as a vignette told from the mother's point of view. She tells the story of the No-Name Woman, her husband's deceased sister. The middle portion of this chapter is Kingston's retelling of the No-Name Woman Story. Kingston uses her own experiences with Chinese tradition and culture to substantiate alternate "versions" of the tale. At the end of "No-Name Woman", Kingston reflects on the importance of her mother's story. She concludes that the real lesson is not how No-Name Woman died, but rather, why she was forgotten.

=== "White Tigers" ===
In the first part of "White Tigers", Kingston recounts her mother's talk-story of Fa Mu Lan, a woman warrior who took her father's place in battle. Kingston reverts to talking about her life in America and compares it to the story of Fa Mu Lan. She cannot gather the courage to speak up against her racist boss, let alone save her people in China. In the end, Kingston decides that she and Fa Mu Lan are similar.

=== "Shaman" ===
Using her mother's old diplomas and photos from her years in China, Kingston recounts the story of her mother's life as a lady scholar. Brave Orchid, Kingston's mother, returns home after two years of study. Kingston was born during World War II and grew up with her mother's talk-stories. Her mother taught her that all white people around her were "ghosts".

=== "At the Western Palace" ===
"At the Western Palace" opens with Brave Orchid, her two children, and her niece at San Francisco International Airport. Brave Orchid is waiting for her sister, Moon Orchid, to arrive from Hong Kong. Moon Orchid is emigrating to the United States after being separated from her sister for 30 years. The sisters arrive back at Brave Orchid's house in the Valley. They are greeted by Brave Orchid's husband, who has aged significantly in Moon Orchid's eyes. Moon Orchid spends the summer in Brave Orchid's house. Brave Orchid, her oldest son, Moon Orchid, and Moon Orchid's daughter drive South to Los Angeles. They are on a mission to find Moon Orchid's husband. At the end of the chapter, Moon Orchid declines in mental health and is forced to return to live with Brave Orchid.

=== "A Song for a Barbarian Reed Pipe" ===
In this story, Kingston reveals that her mother cut the membrane under her tongue. Kingston despises a Chinese girl who is a year older than she is because she refuses to talk. One day, she finds herself alone with the girl in the lavatory. Kingston writes about other eccentric stories. After Kingston screams to her mother and father that she does not want to be set up with the developmentally disabled boy, she launches into a laundry list of things she is and is not going to do, regardless of her mother's opinion. In the final part, Kingston tells the story of Ts'ai Yen, a poet born in A.D. 175.

== Themes ==
=== Necessity and extravagance ===
In an essay about The Woman Warrior, Sau-Ling Cynthia Wong writes about "the protagonist's struggle toward a balance between self-actualization and social responsibility... identified as 'Necessity' and 'Extravagance.'"

== Language and narrative voice ==
The language of The Woman Warrior invokes a complex juxtaposition of cultural and linguistic voices. Kingston tries to capture and emulate the nuances of Chinese speech through her prose. Trying to transmit a Sinitic language by means of an Indo-European language was no easy task, and one that Kingston had to pursue actively. Nevertheless, The Woman Warrior is not pure talk-story. There is, in fact, a blending of first, second, and third person narration. The first-person narration of Kingston is her own American voice, the second-person is that of the Chinese talk-story, and the third-person (which only appears in "At the Western Palace") is a mixture; a talk-story transposed from Kingston's Chinese parents to her American siblings, and finally back to Kingston herself. What results from this combination of voices can only be described as a "fusion language" unique to Kingston, almost like her own type of Creole language.

Writing in this "fusion language", which is an American language with Asian tones and accents, or rhythm, is a way that Kingston brings together Chinese and Western experiences. This "melding" of the two experiences – the images and metaphors—is what makes Kingston's style her own. Kingston admits that one of the ways she works to bring these two together is to speak Chinese while writing or typing in English.

== Writing process ==
The completion of The Woman Warrior came from Kingston's on-the-spot writing of her thoughts. She wrote down anything—until some of it started falling into place. It was this habit that allowed Kingston to complete The Woman Warrior in just three years while teaching at a boarding school that demanded she be on call twenty-four hours a day.

The original title of The Woman Warrior was Gold Mountain Stories. As Kingston stated in a 1986 interview with Jody Hoy:

"The publishers didn't like a title that sounds like a collection of short stories; they never like to publish collections of short stories. I wasn't that happy with either of those titles. I think that calling that book The Woman Warrior emphasizes 'warrior.' I'm not really telling the story of war, I want to be a pacifist."

In terms of Kingston's decision-making process in what to include and exclude from her story, she admits to using only what she deemed was "necessary" cultural imagery. She didn't want readers to approach her work as "exotic." What cultural references she did allow to remain in The Woman Warrior she considered to be more "American-friendly." This, of course, was a very subjective endeavor on her part, and, in a more recent reflection she had on The Woman Warrior, Kingston was quoted as calling the cultural references "really Chinese."

== Criticism ==
Since its publication in 1976, The Woman Warrior has maintained a "vexed reception history that both attests to its popularity and questions it." Much of the debate concerns "autobiographical accuracy, cultural authenticity, and ethnic representativeness," while the central concern is whether or not Kingston offers a faithful representation of Chinese and Chinese American culture.

Asian American scholars have expressed strong criticisms of The Woman Warrior. Writer Jeffery Paul Chan criticized Kingston for posing the book as non-fiction despite the many fictional elements of its stories. He stated that Kingston gave a distorted view of Chinese culture: one that is partially based on her own experience, but mostly fictional. Chan also noted Kingston's mistranslation of the Cantonese term, "ghost", and Benjamin R. Tong, another Asian American writer, stated that this mistranslation was done deliberately to "suit white tastes so that her book would sell better."

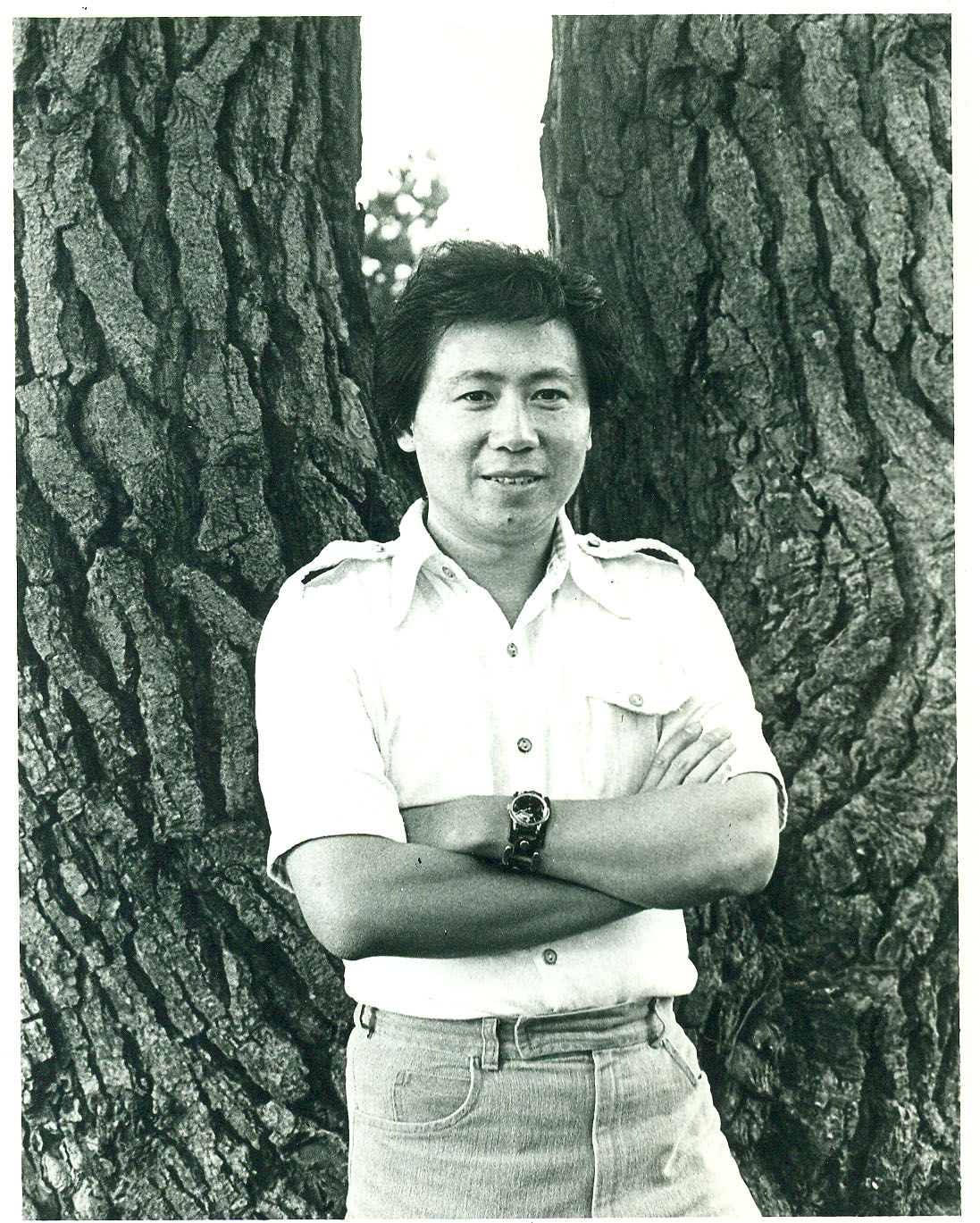
Benjamin R.Tong.

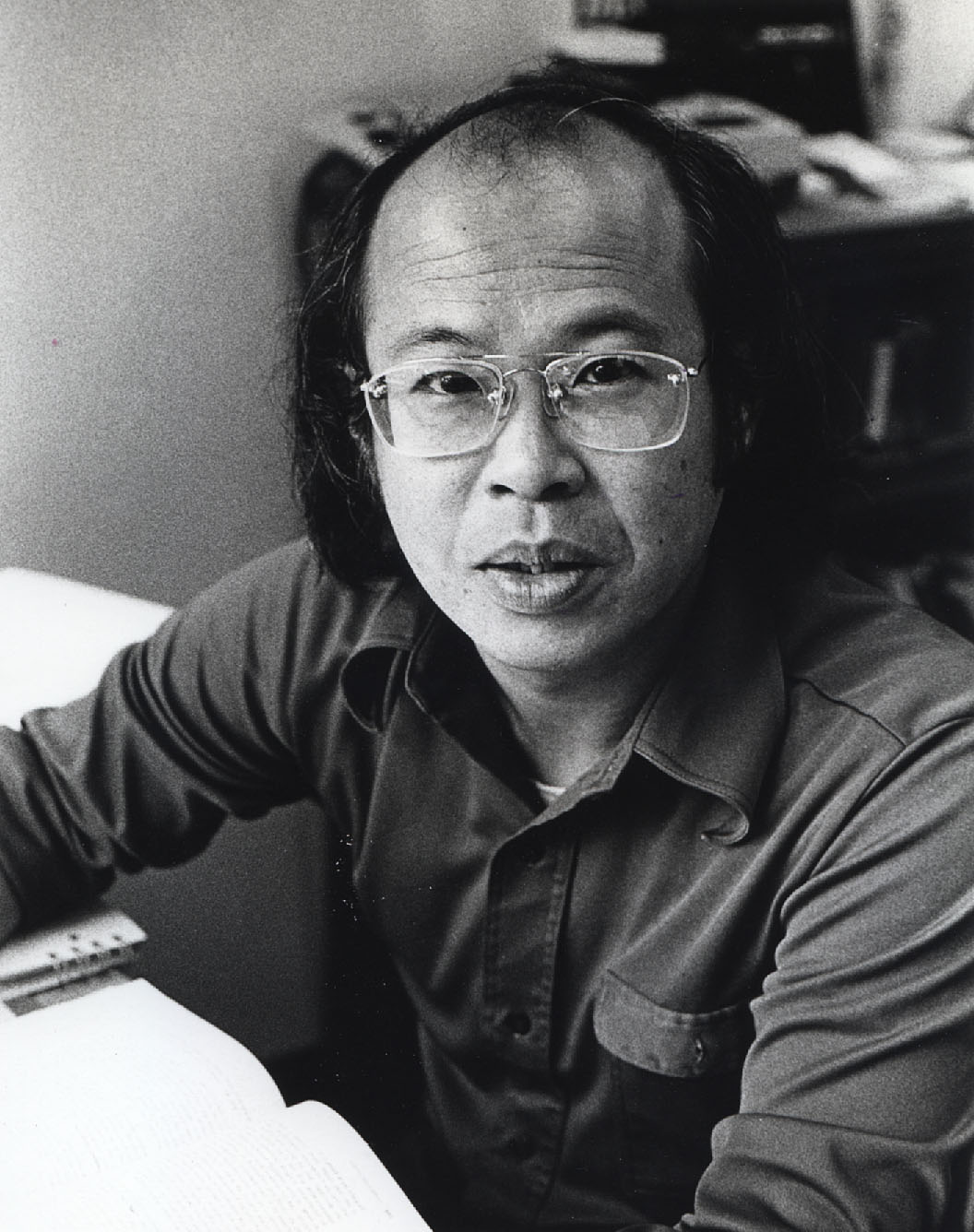
Jeffery Paul Chan.

Tong further stated, based on The Woman Warrior's fictionalized elements and inaccuracies about Chinese culture and history, that Kingston manipulates her white audience by giving them what they think is Chinese culture, which in reality is only a caricature based on Western stereotypes of Chinese people.

Scholar Sheryl Mylan stated that Kingston constructs an Orientalist framework to separate herself from her mother and her culture, but in the process she replicates the ideologies of the American culture. Professor Sau-Ling Cynthia Wong stated that Kingston's "Orientalist effect" is the result of Kingston's failure to commensurately critique the patriarchal values or institutional racism of Western society, resulting in a lopsided and biased commentary regarding Chinese culture. Scholar David Li suggested that The Woman Warrior functions as "a means of contesting power between the dominant culture and the ethnic community; whose value lies in foregrounding the representational issues that have accompanied growth of Asian American creative and critical production."

Among the most caustic criticisms was author and playwright Frank Chin's, who accused Kingston of being "unChinese" and "a fake". Chin criticized Kingston for giving her readers a fictional and exaggerated representation of Chinese people based on American stereotypes, and also criticized her readers for accepting these stereotypes. Chin also accused Kingston of "practising an inauthentic Orientalism inherited from the apologetic autobiographies written in the Chinese American 'high' tradition."

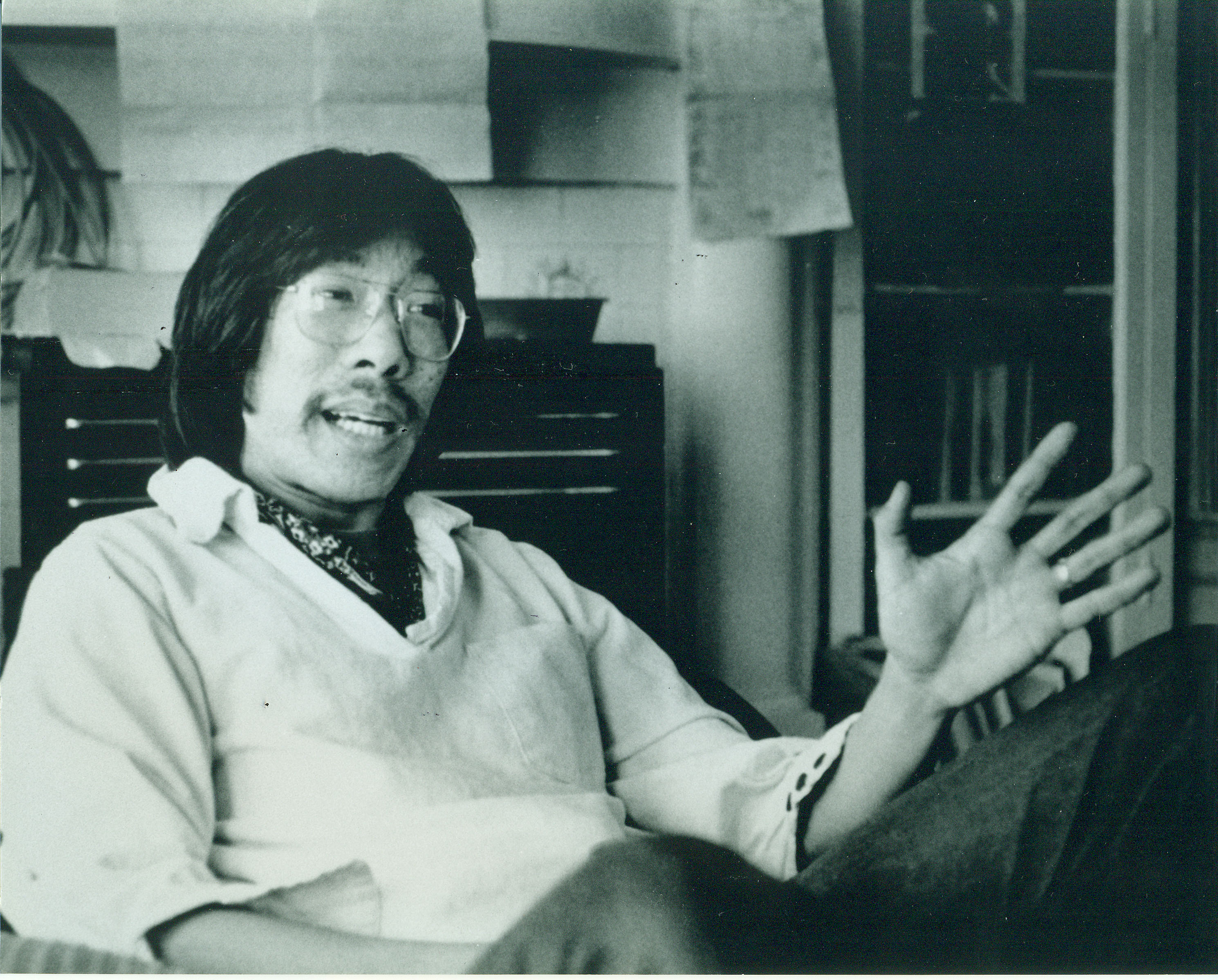
Frank Chin.

In Kingston's defense, reviewer Deborah L. Madsen claimed that this accusation showed Chin's tendency to privilege the low, working-class tradition of Chinese American writing as "authentic", which is not Kingston's tradition. Madsen claimed that autobiographical Chinese American writing is full of competing discourses that differ both culturally and racially, and as Chinese American writers seek both Chinese ethnicity and American citizenship, the result may be "a subversion of racial authenticity", which she believed to be the case with Kingston. Other reviewers, such as Jeehyun Lim, believed that the criticism accusing Kingston of representing the Chinese American community as barbaric "misreads her play with ideas of foreignness and nativeness."

In 1982, Kingston herself wrote a rebuttal essay entitled, "Cultural Mis-readings by American Reviewers", in which she disparaged her critics who she believed were insisting she represent the Chinese to some standard of excellence. "Why must I 'represent' anyone besides myself?" Kingston asked. Others, however, noted that Kingston's stories are fictional and therefore do not represent herself, either. The San Francisco Association of Chinese Teachers warned: "Especially for students unfamiliar with the Chinese background, [The Woman Warrior] could give an overly negative impression of the Chinese American experience." Even a Chinese American female scholar sympathetic to Kingston wrote that "for a minority author to exercise such artistic freedom is perilous business because white critics and reviewers persist in seeing [fictional] expressions by [Kingston] as no more than cultural history."

== See also ==
- Chinese American literature
- List of Asian American writers

== Bibliography ==
- Huang, Judy (2001), Asian-American Literary 'Authenticity': Frank Chin's 1991 Criticism of Maxine Hong Kingston In 1975.
- Huntley, E.D. (2001), Maxine Hong Kingston: A Critical Companion., Greenwood Publishing Group, ISBN 0-313-30877-2
- Kingston, Maxine Hong (1989), The Woman Warrior: Memoirs of a Girlhood Among Ghosts, Random House, ISBN 0-679-72188-6
- Lim, Shirley Geok-lin (Spring 2008), "Reading Back, Looking Forward: A Retrospective Interview with Maxine Hong Kingston", MELUS, 33 (1): 157–170, doi:10.1093/melus/33.1.157
- Madison, Deborah L. (2006). "Chinese American Writers of the Real and the Fake: Authenticity and the Twin Traditions of Life Writing". Canadian Review of American Studies. 36 (3): 257–271. doi:10.3138/CRAS-s036-03-02. Project MUSE 209408.
- Moyers, Bill (March 25, 2007), "Bill Moyers Interview (PBS transcript)", Bill Moyers Journal.
- Wong, Sau-Ling Cynthia (1988). "Necessity and Extravagance in Maxine Hong Kingston's The Woman Warrior: Art and the Ethnic Experience". MELUS. 15 (1): 3–26. doi:10.2307/467038. JSTOR 467038.
- Mitchell, Carol (1981). "'Talking-Story' in The Woman Warrior: An Analysis of the Use of Folklore". Kentucky Folklore Record. 27 (1–2): 5–12. Rpt. in Hunter, Jeffrey W; Vedder, Polly, eds. (2000). Contemporary literary criticism. Vol. 121. Gale Group. ISBN 978-0-7876-3196-3. OCLC 644706880.
- Petit, Angela (March 1, 2003). "'Words so strong': Maxine Hong Kingston's 'No Name Woman' introduces students to the power of words: a powerful story helps students to realize that words can order the world around us and form realities of their own". Journal of Adolescent & Adult Literacy. 46 (6): 482–491. JSTOR 40017149. Gale A98593417.
- Schueller, Malini (1989). "Questioning Race and Gender Definitions: Dialogic Subversions in The Woman Warrior". Criticism. 31 (4): 421–437. JSTOR 23112303. ProQuest 1311725934.
- Kingston, Maxine Hong. "No Name Woman". 1975. Making Literature Matter. Ed. John Schilb and John Clifford. 3rd ed. Boston: Bedford/St. Martin's, 2006. 1154–1163.
