= William T. Vollmann bibliography =

Literary work of William T. Vollmann

The work of American writer William T. Vollmann comprises a variety of genres including literary criticism, war reportage, memoir, popular science, philosophy, photography, art and literary, historical and science fiction. His book-length works are often distinguished by their considerable length.

== Book-length works ==
=== Fiction ===
==== Novels ====
- You Bright and Risen Angels (1987, Penguin)
- Seven Dreams: A Book of North American Landscapes (1990-)
  - Volume I: The Ice-Shirt (1990, Viking)
  - Volume II: Fathers and Crows (1992, Viking)
  - Volume III: Argall (2001, Viking)
  - Volume V: The Dying Grass (2015, Viking)
  - Volume VI: The Rifles (1994, Viking)
- Whores for Gloria (1992, Pantheon)
- The Atlas (1996, Viking)
- The Royal Family (2000, Viking)
- Europe Central (2005, Viking)
- The Lucky Star (2020, Viking)
- A Table for Fortune (2026, Arcade Publishing), a four-part novel

==== Short story collections ====
- The Rainbow Stories (1989, Penguin)
- Thirteen Stories and Thirteen Epitaphs (1991, Pantheon)
- Butterfly Stories (1993, Grove)
- Last Stories and Other Stories (2014, Penguin)

=== Non-fiction ===
- An Afghanistan Picture Show (1992, Farrar, Straus and Giroux)
- Rising Up and Rising Down (2003, McSweeney's), seven-volume collection
- Rising Up and Rising Down: Some Thoughts on Violence, Freedom and Urgent Means (2005, Ecco), abridged version
- Uncentering the Earth: Copernicus and the Revolutions of the Heavenly Spheres (2006, Atlas Books/W. W. Norton)
- Poor People (2007, Ecco)
- Riding Towards Everywhere (2008, Ecco)
- Imperial (2009, Viking)
- Kissing the Mask (2010, Ecco)
- Into the Forbidden Zone: A Trip Through Hell and High Water in Post-Earthquake Japan (2011, Byliner Books), published as an ebook
- Carbon Ideologies (2018)
  - No Immediate Danger: Volume One (2018, Viking)
  - No Good Alternative: Volume Two (2018, Viking)

=== Photography and art ===
- Four Platinum Prints (2002, CoTangent Press)
- The Feminine (2008, CoTangent Press)
- Imperial (2009, powerHouse Books)
- The Book of Dolores (2013, powerHouse Books)
- Shadows of Love, Shadows of Loneliness: Volume One (2023, Rare Bird Books)
- Shadows of Love, Shadows of Loneliness: Volume Two (2023, Rare Bird Books)

=== Anthologies ===
- Expelled from Eden: A William T. Vollmann Reader (2004, Thunder’s Mouth Press), edited by Larry McCaffery and Michael Hemmingson

== Limited edition publications ==
- Tale of the Dying Lung (1988, Vagabond Press), prose poem with a chest x-ray, limited to 200 copies
- Violet Hair (1988, CoTangent Press), a story from The Rainbow Stories decorated with snake bones, bells and rosaries, limited to one copy
- The Convict Bird: A Children's Poem (1988, CoTangent Press), bound with steel, limited to 90 copies
- The Happy Girls (1991, CoTangent Press), hand-sewn Elephant folio, limited to thirteen copies
- Epitaph for Mien (1991 CoTangent Press), limited to one copy
- The Grave of Lost Stories (Undated, CoTangent Press), text from Thirteen Stories and Thirteen Epitaphs, one edition of fifteen copies was bound with white marble, another edition of twenty copies was published without the white marble
- Whores for Gloria (1993, CoTangent Press), with photographs by Ken Miller and illustrations from Vollmann, two different editions were published
- Butterfly Stories (1993, CoTangent Press), bound with lingerie, limited to thirteen or fourteen copies
- The Book of Candles (2006, CoTangent Press), poetry hand-printed with woodblock and magnesium relief prints, limited to ten copies

== Shorter works ==
=== Reviews and literary criticism ===
- Review of Biography of Conrad Aiken by Edward Butscher (18 September 1988, San Francisco Chronicle)
- Review of The Hot Jazz Trio by William Kotzwinkle (19 November 1989, Los Angeles Times Book Review)
- Review of The Drummer of the Eleventh North Devonshire Fusiliers by Guy Davenport (2 December 1990, Philadelphia Inquirer)
- "American Writing Today: A Diagnosis of the Disease" (Spring 1990, Conjunctions)
- Review of Pinocchio in Venice by Robert Coover (27 January 1991, Philadelphia Inquirer)
- Review of The Choiring of the Trees by Donald Harington (5 May 1991, New York Times Book Review)
- Review of The Terrors of Ice and Darkness by Christopher Ransmayr (21 July 1991, Philadelphia Inquirer)
- Review of The Mysterious History of Columbus by John Noble Wilford (13 October 1991, Philadelphia Inquirer)
- Review of Regeneration by Pat Barker (19 April 1992, Phladelphia Inquirer)
- Review of Raven's Children by Richard Adams Carey (5 July 1992, Los Angeles Times Book Review)
- Review of Wrong: Stories by Dennis Cooper (26 April 1992, New York Times Book Review)
- Review of Cry Me a River by T. R. Pearson (11 April 1993, New York Times Book Review)
- "Something to Die For" (Summer 1993, Review of Contemporary Fiction)
- Review of They Whisper by Robert Olin Butler (13 February 1994, Philadelphia Inquirer)
- Review of Arise and Walk by Barry Gifford (13 July 1994, New York Times Book Review)
- Review of American Tabloid by James Ellroy (26 February 1995, New York Times Book Review)
- Review of On The Natural History of Destruction by W. G. Sebald (May 2003, The Believer)
- Review of You Alone Are Real to Me: Remembering Rainer Maria Rilke by Lou Andreas-Salom (2003, American Book Review)
- Review of Friedrich Nietzsche by Curtis Cate (14 August 2005, New York Times Book Review)
- Review of A Moment in the Sun by John Sayles (June/July 2011, Bookforum)

=== Short fiction, journalism and creative prose ===
- "Scintillant Orange" (Spring 1988, Conjunctions)
- "The White Knights" (Fall 1988, Conjunctions), with photographs by Ken Miller
- "The Quest for Polar Treasures" (Spring 1989, Conjunctions)
- "The Grave of Lost Stories" (Fall 1989, Conjunctions)
- "Divine Men" (1990, Grand Street)
- "Pornography's Top Components" (1991, Fiction International)
- "The Cave of Sheets" (1991, Grand Street)
- "An Incomplete Biography of Amantacha the Huron" (Spring 1991, Conjunctions)
- "The Butterfly Girl" (Spring 1992, Conjunctions) - FIND CITE Probably McCaffery
- "The Prophet of the Road" (28 June 1982, Los Angeles Times Magazine)
- "San Diego, California, USA (1988)", in Avant-Pop: Fiction for a Daydream Nation (1992, Black Ice Books)
- "DeSade's Last Stand" (November 1992, Esquire)
- "Letter from Somalia: Killing Time with the Widowmakers" (May 1993, Esquire)
- "Last Days at the Bakery: Sarejevo, Bosnia-Herzogivina" (Spring 1994, Story)
- "Incarnations of the Murderer" (1995, After Yesterday's Crash: The Avant-Pop Anthology)
- "Writing" (1998, Why I Write: Thoughts on the Practice of Fiction)
- "Letter from Afghanistan: Across the Divide" (15 May 2000, New Yorker)
- "The Best Way to Smoke Crack" (2001, What the Fuck: The Avant-Porn Anthology)
- "San Francisco" (2006, State by State: A Panoramic Portrait of America)
- "Homeless in Sacramento" (March 2015, Harper's Magazine)
- "Life as a Terrorist: Uncovering my FBI File" (September 2013, Harper's Magazine)
- "Invisible and Insidious: Living at the Edge of Fukushima's Nuclear Disaster" (March 2015, Harper's Magazine)
- "Letter of Recommendation: The Gnostic Scriptures" (11 April 2015, New York Times)
- "Just Keep Going North" (2019, Harper's Magazine)

== Interviews ==
- "A Conversation with William T. Vollmann" (1993, Review of Contemporary Fiction), by Larry McCaffery
- "William T. Vollmann, The Art of Fiction No. 163" (Fall 200, Paris Review), by Madison Smartt Bell
- "An Interview with William T. Vollmann" (August/September 2004, While You Were Sleeping), by Daniel Lukes
- "An Interview with William T. Vollmann" (November 2005, Bookslut) by Tony Dushane
- "What's in the Meat Locker, Bill?" (6 August 2006, The Independent), by Matt Thorne
- William T. Vollmann: A Critical Study and Seven Interviews (2009, McFarland) by Michael Hemmingson
- Conversations with William T. Vollmann (2020, University Press of Mississippi), edited by Daniel Lukes

== Sources ==
- Carroll, Tobias (9 March 2023). "William T. Vollmann: A Readers Guide". Vol. 1 Brooklyn.
- Hemmingson, Michael (2012). William T. Vollmann: An Annotated Bibliography. Plymouth, UK: Scarecrow Press. ISBN 978-0-8108-8224-9.
- Lukes, Daniel, ed. (2020). Conversations with William T. Vollmann. University Press of Mississippi. ISBN 978-1-4968-2669-5.
- McCaffery, Larry (1996). "Moth in the Flame: An interview with William T. Vollmann". Some Other Frequency: Interviews with Innovative American Authors. Philadelphia: University of Pennsylvania Press. pp. 310–333. ISBN 0-8122-1442-0.
- Özcan, Işıl (2019). Understanding William T. Vollmann. The University of South Carolina Press. ISBN 9781643360294.
- Spielmann, Katherine (Summer 1993). "The books as apparatus: William Vollmann's special editions". The Review of Contemporary Fiction. 13 (2): 64 – via Gale.
