= National Book Critics Circle Award for Nonfiction =

Annual American literary award for nonfiction books

- Awarded for: "the finest books and reviews published in English"
- Sponsored by: National Book Critics Circle
- First award: 1976
- Website: https://www.bookcritics.org/awards

The National Book Critics Circle Award for Nonfiction, established in 1976, is an annual American literary award presented by the National Book Critics Circle (NBCC) to promote "the finest books and reviews published in English." Awards are presented annually to books published in the U.S. during the preceding calendar year in six categories: Fiction, Nonfiction, Poetry, Memoir/Autobiography, Biography, and Criticism.

Books previously published in English are not eligible, such as re-issues and paperback editions. They do consider "translations, short story and essay collections, self published books, and any titles that fall under the general categories."

The judges are the volunteer directors of the NBCC who are 24 members serving rotating three-year terms, with eight elected annually by the voting members, namely "professional book review editors and book reviewers." Winners of the awards are announced each year at the NBCC awards ceremony in conjunction with the yearly membership meeting, which takes place in March.

== Recipients ==
National Book Critics Circle Award for Nonfiction winners and finalists
Year	Author	Title	Result	Ref.
1975	R. W. B. Lewis	Edith Wharton: A Biography	Winner	
1976	Maxine Hong Kingston	The Woman Warrior: Memoirs of a Girlhood among Ghosts	Winner	
1976	George Dangerfield	The Damnable Question: A Study in Anglo-Irish Relations	Finalist	
1976	Alex Haley	Roots	Finalist	
1976	Irving Howe with Kenneth Libo	World of Our Fathers	Finalist	
1976	Richard Kluger	Simple Justice: The History of Brown v. Board of Education and Black America's Struggle for Equality	Finalist	
1977	Walter Jackson Bate	Samuel Johnson	Winner	
1977	Michael Herr	Dispatches	Finalist	
1977	David McCullough	The Path Between the Seas: The Creation of the Panama Canal, 1870-1914	Finalist	
1977	John McPhee	Coming Into the Country	Finalist	
1977	Carl Sagan	The Dragons of Eden: Speculations on the Evolution of Human Intelligence	Finalist	
1978	Maureen Howard	Facts of Life	Winner	
1978	Garry Wills	Inventing America: Jefferson's Declaration of Independence	Winner	
1978	Barbara W. Tuchman	A Distant Mirror: The Calamitous 14th Century	Finalist	
1978	Theodore H. White	In Search of History: A Personal Adventure	Finalist	
1978	Barrington Moore	Injustice: The Social Bases of Obedience and Revolt	Finalist	
1978	Sissela Bok	Lying: Moral Choice in Public and Private Life	Finalist	
1978	A. Scott Berg	Max Perkins: Editor of Genius	Finalist	
1978	Alfred Kazin	New York Jew	Finalist	
1978	Anne Hollander	Seeing Through Clothes	Finalist	
1978	Peter Matthiessen	The Snow Leopard	Finalist	
1979	Telford Taylor	Munich: The Price of Peace	Winner	
1979	Tom Wolfe	The Right Stuff	Finalist	
1979	Joan Didion	The White Album	Finalist	
1979	Edward Hoagland	African Calliope: A Journey to the Sudan	Finalist	
1979	Douglas Hofstadter	Godel, Escher, Bach: An Eternal Golden Brain	Finalist	
1980	Ronald Steel	Walter Lippmann and the American Century	Winner	
1980	Jean Strouse	Alice James: A Biography	Finalist	
1980	Maxine Hong Kingston	China Men	Finalist	
1980	John Boswell	Christianity, Social Tolerance, and Homosexuality: Gay People in Western Europe from the Beginning of the Christian Era to the 14th Century	Finalist	
1980	Justin D. Kaplan	Walt Whitman: A Life	Finalist	
1981	Stephen Jay Gould	The Mismeasure of Man	Winner	
1981	James Fallows	National Defense	Finalist	
1981	T. J. Jackson Lears	No Place of Grace: Antimodernism and the Transformation of American Culture, 1880-1920	Finalist	
1981	Dumas Malone	The Sage of Monticello: Jefferson and His Time, Volume Six	Finalist	
1981	Erving Goffman	Forms of Talk	Finalist	
1982	Robert Caro	The Path to Power: The Years of Lyndon Johnson	Winner	
1982	George F. Kennan	The Nuclear Delusion: Soviet-American Relations in the Atomic Age	Finalist	
1982	Jonathan Schell	The Fate of the Earth	Finalist	
1982	Daniel Lawrence O’Keefe	Stolen Lightning	Finalist	
1982	Kate Simon	Bronx Primitive: Portraits in a Childhood	Finalist	
1983	Seymour M. Hersh	The Price of Power: Kissinger in the Nixon White House	Winner	
1983	Roger Rosenblatt	Children of War	Finalist	
1983	William W. Warner	Distant Water: The Fate of the North Atlantic Fisherman	Finalist	
1983	Theodore Draper	Present History: On Nuclear War, Détente and Other	Finalist	
1983	David S. Landes	Revolution in Time: Clocks and the Making of the Modern World	Finalist	
1984	Freeman Dyson	Weapons and Hope	Winner	
1984	David Wyman	The Abandonment of the Jews: America and the Holocaust 1941–1945	Finalist	
1984	John Edgar Wideman	Brothers and Keepers	Finalist	
1984	Robert Darnton	The Great Cat Massacre and Other Episodes in French Cultural History	Finalist	
1984	Evan Connell	Son of the Morning Star: Custer and the Little Big Horn	Finalist	
1985	J. Anthony Lukas	Common Ground: A Turbulent Decade in the Lives of Three American Families	Winner	
1985	Tracy Kidder	House	Finalist	
1985	Elaine Scarry	The Body in Pain: The Making and Unmaking of the World	Finalist	
1985	Alan Riding	Distant Neighbors: The Portrait of the Mexicans	Finalist	
1985	Eva Keuls	The Reign of the Phallus: Sexual Politics in Ancient Athens	Finalist	
1986	Barry Lopez	Arctic Dreams: Imagination and Desire in a Northern Landscape	Winner	
1986	Bernard Bailyn	Voyagers to the West: A Passage in the Peopling of America on the Eve of the Revolution	Finalist	
1986	Jonathan Evan Maslow	Bird of Life, Bird of Death: A Naturalist's Journey Through a Land of Political Turmoil	Finalist	
1986	John W. Dower	War Without Mercy: Race and Power in the Pacific War	Finalist	
1986	Marc Reisner	Cadillac Desert: The American West and its Disappearing Water	Finalist	
1987	Richard Rhodes	The Making of the Atomic Bomb	Winner	
1987	Randy Shilts	And the Band Played On: Politics, People and the AIDS Epidemic	Finalist	
1987	James Miller	Democracy Is in the Streets	Finalist	
1987	Charles Mee	The Genius of the People	Finalist	
1987	Stephen Jay Gould	Time's Arrow, Time's Cycle	Finalist	
1988	Taylor Branch	Parting the Waters: America in the King Years, 1954–63	Winner	
1988	James M. McPherson	Battle Cry of Freedom: The Civil War Era	Finalist	
1988	Neil Sheehan	A Bright Shining Lie: John Paul Vann and America in Vietnam	Finalist	
1988	Jane Kramer	Europeans	Finalist	
1988	Eric Foner	Reconstruction: America's Unfinished Revolution, 1863-1877	Finalist	
1989	Michael Dorris	The Broken Cord	Winner	
1989	Tracy Kidder	Among Schoolchildren	Finalist	
1989	Barbara Ehrenreich	Fear of Falling: The Inner Life of the Middle Class	Finalist	
1989	David Fromkin	A Peace to End All Peace: Creating the Modern Middle East, 1914-1922	Finalist	
1989	Amy Wilentz	The Rainy Season: Haiti Since Duvalier	Finalist	
1990	Shelby Steele	The Content of Our Character: A New Vision of Race in America	Winner	
1990	Mike Davis	City of Quartz: Excavating the Future in Los Angeles	Finalist	
1990	Alma Guillermoprieto	Samba	Finalist	
1990	O. B. Hardison	Disappearing Through the Skylight: Culture and Technology in the 20th Century	Finalist	
1990	Kevin Phillips	The Politics of Rich and Poor: Wealth and the American Electorate in the Reagan Aftermath	Finalist	
1991	Susan Faludi	Backlash: The Undeclared War Against American Women	Winner	
1991	Thomas Geoghegan	Which Side Are You on? Trying to Be for Labor When It's Flat on Its Back	Finalist	
1991	Melissa Fay Greene	Praying for Sheetrock	Finalist	
1991	Jonathan Kozol	Savage Inequalities: Children in America's Schools	Finalist	
1991	Dennis Overbye	Lonely Hearts of the Cosmos: The Scientific Quest for the Secret of the Universe	Finalist	
1992	Norman Maclean	Young Men and Fire	Winner	
1992	Michael D. Coe	Breaking the Maya Code	Finalist	
1992	Donald Katz	Home Fires: An Intimate Portrait of One Middle-Class Family in Postwar America	Finalist	
1992	Nancy Scheper-Hughes	Death Without Weeping: The Violence of Everyday Life in Brazil	Finalist	
1992	Edward O. Wilson	The Diversity of Life	Finalist	
1993	Alan Lomax	The Land Where the Blues Began	Winner	
1993	Rosemary Mahoney	Whoredom in Kimmage: Irish Women Coming of Age	Finalist	
1993	George B. Schaller	The Last Panda	Finalist	
1993	Russ Rymer	Genie: An Abused Child's Flight From Silence	Finalist	
1993	David Remnick	Lenin's Tomb: The Last Days of the Soviet Empire	Finalist	
1994	Lynn H. Nicholas	The Rape of Europa: The Fate of Europe's Treasures in the Third Reich and the Second World War	Winner	
1994	Jane Mayer and Jill Abramson	Strange Justice: The Selling of Clarence Thomas	Finalist	
1994	Abraham Verghese	My Own Country: A Doctor's Story	Finalist	
1994	Sherwin Nuland	How We Die: Reflections on Life's Final Chapter	Finalist	
1994	John Demos	The Unredeemed Captive: A Family Story from Early America	Finalist	
1995	Jonathan Harr	A Civil Action	Winner	
1995	Nicholas Basbanes	A Gentle Madness: Bibliophiles, Bibliomanes, and the Eternal Passion for Books	Finalist	
1995	Madeleine Blais	In These Girls, Hope Is a Muscle	Finalist	
1995	Fox Butterfield	All God's Children: The Bosket Family and the American Tradition of Violence	Finalist	
1995	Lawrence Weschler	Mr. Wilson's Cabinet of Wonder	Finalist	
1996	Jonathan Raban	Bad Land: An American Romance	Winner	
1996	David Denby	Great Books	Finalist	
1996	Daniel Goldhagen	Hitler's Willing Executioners: Ordinary Germans and the Holocaust	Finalist	
1996	Richard Kluger	Ashes to Ashes: America's Hundred-Year Cigarette War, the Public Health, and the Unabashed Triumph of Philip Morris	Finalist	
1996	Bernard Lewis	The Middle East: A Brief History of the Last 2,000 Years	Finalist	
1997	Anne Fadiman	The Spirit Catches You and You Fall Down: A Hmong Child, Her American Doctors, and the Collision of Two Cultures	Winner	
1997	Jon Krakauer	Into Thin Air: A Personal Account of the Mt. Everest Disaster	Finalist	
1997	James Kugel	The Bible as It Was	Finalist	
1997	Pauline Maier	American Scripture: Making the Declaration of Independence	Finalist	
1997	Steven Pinker	How the Mind Works	Finalist	
1998	Philip Gourevitch	We Wish to Inform You That Tomorrow We Will Be Killed With Our Families	Winner	
1998	Adam Hochschild	King Leopold's Ghost: A Story of Greed, Terror and Heroism in Colonial Africa	Finalist	
1998	Ira Berlin	Many Thousands Gone: The First Two Centuries of Slavery in North America	Finalist	
1998	Roy Porter	The Bible as It Was	Finalist	
1998	Simon Winchester	The Professor and the Madman: A Tale of Murder, Insanity, and the Making of the Oxford English Dictionary	Finalist	
1999	Jonathan Weiner	Time, Love, Memory: A Great Biologist and His Quest for the Origins of Behavior	Winner	
1999	Jane Brox	Five Thousand Days Like This One: An American Family History	Finalist	
1999	John W. Dower	Embracing Defeat: Japan in the Wake of World War II	Finalist	
1999	Patricia Hampl	I Could Tell You Stories: Sojourns in the Land of Memory	Finalist	
1999	Jean-Paul Kauffmann	The Black Room at Longwood: Napoleon’s Exile on Saint Helena	Finalist	
2000	Ted Conover	Newjack: Guarding Sing Sing	Winner	
2000	Fred Anderson	Crucible of War: The Seven Years' War and the Fate of Empire in British North America, 1754-1766	Finalist	
2000	Frances FitzGerald	Way Out There in the Blue: Reagan, Star Wars and the End of the Cold War	Finalist	
2000	Laurie Garrett	Betrayal of Trust: The Collapse of Global Public Health	Finalist	
2000	Alice Kaplan	The Collaborator: The Trial and Execution of Robert Brasillach	Finalist	
2001	Nicholson Baker	Double Fold: Libraries and the Assault on Paper	Winner	
2001	Nina Bernstein	The Lost Children of Wilder: The Epic Struggle to Change Foster Care	Finalist	
2001	Jan T. Gross	Neighbors: The Destruction of the Jewish Community in Jedwabne, Poland	Finalist	
2001	Laura Hillenbrand	Seabiscuit: An American Legend	Finalist	
2001	Sam Roberts	The Brother: The Untold Story of Atomic Spy David Greenglass and How He Sent His Sister, Ethel Rosenberg, to the Electric Chair	Finalist	
2002	Samantha Power	A Problem from Hell: America and the Age of Genocide	Winner	
2002	Chris Hedges	War Is a Force That Gives Us Meaning	Finalist	
2002	William Langewiesche	American Ground: Unbuilding the World Trade Center	Finalist	
2002	Richard Rodriguez	Brown: The Last Discovery of America	Finalist	
2002	Gaby Wood	Edison's Eve: A Magical History of the Quest for Mechanical Life	Finalist	
2003	Paul Hendrickson	Sons of Mississippi	Winner	
2003	Caroline Alexander	The Bounty: The True Story of the Mutiny on the Bounty	Finalist	
2003	Anne Applebaum	Gulag	Finalist	
2003	Adrian Nicole LeBlanc	Random Family: Love, Drugs, Trouble, and Coming of Age	Finalist	
2003	William T. Vollmann	Rising Up and Rising Down	Finalist	
2004	Diarmaid MacCulloch	The Reformation: A History	Winner	
2004	Kevin Boyle	Arc of Justice: A Saga of Race, Civil Rights and Murder in the Jazz Age	Finalist	
2004	Edward Conlon	Blue Blood	Finalist	
2004	David Shipler	The Working Poor: Invisible in America	Finalist	
2004	Timothy Tyson	Blood Done Sign My Name: A True Story	Finalist	
2005	Svetlana Alexievich	Voices from Chernobyl: The Oral History of a Nuclear Disaster	Winner	
2005	Robert Fisk	The Great War for Civilisation: The Conquest of the Middle East	Finalist	
2005	Ellen Meloy	Eating Stone: Imagination and the Loss of the Wild	Finalist	
2005	Caroline Moorehead	Human Cargo: A Journey Among Refugees	Finalist	
2005	Anthony Shadid	Night Draws Near: Iraq's People in the Shadow of America's War	Finalist	
2006	Simon Schama	Rough Crossings: Britain, the Slaves and the American Revolution	Winner	
2006	Patrick Cockburn	The Occupation: War and Resistance in Iraq	Finalist	
2006	Ann Fessler	The Girls Who Went Away: The Hidden History of Women Who Surrendered Children for Adoption in the Decades Before Roe V. Wade	Finalist	
2006	Michael Pollan	The Omnivore’s Dilemma: A Natural History of Four Meals	Finalist	
2006	Sandy Tolan	The Lemon Tree: An Arab, a Jew and the Heart of the Middle East	Finalist	
2007	Harriet A. Washington	Medical Apartheid: The Dark History of Medical Experimentation on Black Americans From Colonial Times to the Present	Winner	
2007	Philip Gura	American Transcendentalism	Finalist	
2007	Tim Weiner	Legacy of Ashes: A History of the CIA	Finalist	
2007	Alan Weisman	The World Without Us	Finalist	
2007	Daniel Walker Howe	What Hath God Wrought: The Transformation of America 1815–1848	Finalist	
2008	Dexter Filkins	The Forever War	Winner	
2008	George C. Herring	From Colony to Superpower: US Foreign Relations Since 1776	Finalist	
2008	Jane Mayer	The Dark Side: The Inside Story of How the War on Terror Turned Into a War on American Ideals	Finalist	
2008	Drew Gilpin Faust	This Republic of Suffering: Death and the American Civil War	Finalist	
2008	Allan Lichtman	White Protestant Nation: The Rise of the American Conservative Movement	Finalist	
2009	Richard Holmes	The Age of Wonder: How the Romantic Generation Discovered the Beauty and Terror of Science	Winner	
2009	Greg Grandin	Fordlandia: The Rise and Fall of Henry Ford's Forgotten Jungle City	Finalist	
2009	William T. Vollmann	Imperial	Finalist	
2009	Tracy Kidder	Strength in What Remains	Finalist	
2009	Wendy Doniger	The Hindus: An Alternative History	Finalist	
2010	Isabel Wilkerson	The Warmth of Other Suns: The Epic Story of America's Great Migration	Winner	
2010	Jennifer Homans	Apollo's Angels: A History of Ballet	Finalist	
2010	S.C. Gwynne	Empire of the Summer Moon: Quanah Parker and the Rise and Fall of the Comanches, the Most Powerful Indian Tribe in American	Finalist	
2010	Barbara Demick	Nothing to Envy: Ordinary Lives in North Korea	Finalist	
2010	Siddhartha Mukherjee	The Emperor of All Maladies: A Biography of Cancer	Finalist	
2011	Maya Jasanoff	Liberty's Exiles: American Loyalists in the Revolutionary World	Winner	
2011	Amanda Foreman	A World on Fire: Britain's Crucial Role in the American Civil War	Finalist	
2011	John Jeremiah Sullivan	Pulphead: Essays	Finalist	
2011	James Gleick	The Information: A History, a Theory, a Flood	Finalist	
2011	Adam Hochschild	To End All Wars: A Story of Loyalty and Rebellion, 1914-1918	Finalist	
2012	Andrew Solomon	Far from the Tree: Parents, Children, and the Search for Identity	Winner	
2012	Katherine Boo	Behind the Beautiful Forevers: Life, Death, and Hope in a Mumbai Undercity	Finalist	
2012	Steve Coll	Private Empire: ExxonMobil and American Power	Finalist	
2012	David Quammen	Spillover: Animal Infections and the Next Human Pandemic	Finalist	
2012	Jim Holt	Why Does the World Exist?: An Existential Detective Story	Finalist	
2013	Sheri Fink	Five Days at Memorial: Life and Death in a Storm-Ravaged Hospital	Winner	
2013	Lawrence Wright	Going Clear: Scientology, Hollywood, and the Prison of Belief	Finalist	
2013	David Finkel	Thank You for Your Service	Finalist	
2013	George Packer	The Unwinding: An Inner History of the New America	Finalist	
2013	Kevin Cullen and Shelley Murphy	Whitey Bulger: America's Most Wanted Gangster and the Manhunt That Brought Him to Justice	Finalist	
2014	David Brion Davis	The Problem of Slavery in the Age of Emancipation	Winner	
2014	Thomas Piketty with Arthur Goldhammer (trans.)	Capital in the Twenty-First Century	Finalist	
2014	Hector Tobar	Deep Down Dark: The Untold Stories of 33 Men Buried in a Chilean Mine, and the Miracle that Set Them Free	Finalist	
2014	Elizabeth Kolbert	The Sixth Extinction: An Unnatural History	Finalist	
2014	Peter Finn and Petra Couvee	The Zhivago Affair: The Kremlin, the CIA, and the Battle over a Forbidden Book	Finalist	
2015	Sam Quinones	Dreamland: The True Story of America's Opiate Epidemic	Winner	
2015	Jill Leovy	Ghettoside: A True Story of Murder in America	Finalist	
2015	Ari Berman	Give Us the Ballot: The Modern Struggle for Voting Rights in America	Finalist	
2015	Mary Beard	SPQR: A History of Ancient Rome	Finalist	
2015	Brian Seibert	What the Eye Hears: A History of Tap Dancing	Finalist	
2016	Matthew Desmond	Evicted: Poverty and Profit in the American City	Winner	
2016	Jane Mayer	Dark Money: The Hidden History of the Billionaires Behind the Rise of the Radical Right	Finalist	
2016	Viet Thanh Nguyen	Nothing Ever Dies: Vietnam and the Memory of War	Finalist	
2016	Ibram X. Kendi	Stamped from the Beginning: The Definitive History of Racist Ideas in America	Finalist	
2016	John Edgar Wideman	Writing to Save a Life: The Louis Till File	Finalist	
2017	Frances FitzGerald	The Evangelicals: The Struggle to Shape America	Winner	
2017	Adam Rutherford	A Brief History of Everyone Who Ever Lived: The Human Story Retold Through Our Genes	Finalist	
2017	Kapka Kassabova	Border: A Journey to the Edge of Europe	Finalist	
2017	Jack Davis	Gulf: The Making of An American Sea	Finalist	
2017	Masha Gessen	The Future is History: How Totalitarianism Reclaimed Russia	Finalist	
2018	Steve Coll	Directorate S: The C.I.A. and America's Secret Wars in Afghanistan and Pakistan	Winner	
2018	Lawrence Wright	God Save Texas: A Journey into the Soul of the Lone Star State	Finalist	
2018	Greg Lukianoff and Jonathan Haidt	The Coddling of the American Mind: How Good Intentions and Bad Ideas Are Setting Up a Generation for Failure	Finalist	
2018	Francisco Cantú	The Line Becomes a River: Dispatches from the Border	Finalist	
2018	Adam Winkler	We the Corporations: How American Businesses Won Their Civil Rights	Finalist	
2019	Patrick Radden Keefe	Say Nothing: The True Story of Murder and Memory in Northern Ireland	Winner	
2019	Kate Brown	Manual for Survival: A Chernobyl Guide to the Future	Finalist	
2019	Rachel Louise Snyder	No Visible Bruises: What We Don't Know About Domestic Violence Can Kill Us	Finalist	
2019	Walt Odets	Out of the Shadows: Reimagining Gay Men's Lives	Finalist	
2019	Peter Hessler	The Buried: An Archaeology of the Egyptian Revolution	Finalist	
2020	Tom Zoellner	Island on Fire: The Revolt That Ended Slavery in the British Empire	Winner	
2020	Isabel Wilkerson	Caste: The Origins of Our Discontent	Finalist	
2020	James Shapiro	Shakespeare in a Divided America: What His Plays Tell Us About Our Past and Future	Finalist	
2020	Sarah Smarsh	She Come By It Natural: Dolly Parton and the Women Who Lived Her Songs	Finalist	
2020	Walter Johnson	The Broken Heart of America: St. Louis and the Violent History of the United States	Finalist	
2021	Clint Smith	How the Word Is Passed: A Reckoning with the History of Slavery Across America	Winner	
2021	Patrick Radden Keefe	Empire of Pain: The Secret History of the Sackler Dynasty	Finalist	
2021	Rebecca Solnit	Orwell's Roses	Finalist	
2021	Joshua Prager	The Family Roe: An American Story	Finalist	
2021	Sam Quinones	The Least of Us: True Tales of America and Hope in the Time of Fentanyl and Meth	Finalist	
2022	Isaac Butler	The Method: How the Twentieth Century Learned to Act	Winner	
2022	Kelly Lytle Hernández	Bad Mexicans: Race, Empire, and Revolution in the Borderlands	Finalist	
2022	Joseph Osmundson	Virology: Essays for the Living, the Dead, and the Small Things in Between	Finalist	
2022	Annie Proulx	Fen, Bog & Swamp: A Short History of Peatland Destruction and Its Role in the Climate Crisis	Finalist	
2022	Ed Yong	An Immense World: How Animal Senses Reveal the Hidden Realms Around Us	Finalist	
2023	Roxanna Asgarian	We Were Once a Family: A Story of Love, Death, and Child Removal in America	Winner	
2023	Kerry Howley	Bottoms Up and the Devil Laughs	Finalist	
2023	Dina Nayeri	Who Gets Believed? When the Truth Isn't Enough	Finalist	
2023	Jeff Sharlet	The Undertow: Scenes from a Slow Civil War	Finalist	
2023	Christina Sharpe	Ordinary Notes	Finalist	
2024	Adam Higginbotham	Challenger: A True Story of Heroism and Disaster on the Edge of Space	Winner	
2024	Steve Coll	The Achilles Trap: Saddam Hussein, the C.I.A., and the Origins of America’s Invasion of Iraq	Finalist	
2024	Tricia Romano	The Freaks Came Out To Write: The Definitive History of the Village Voice, the Radical Paper That Changed American Culture	Finalist	
2024	Gretchen Sisson	Relinquished: The Politics of Adoption and the Privilege of American Motherhood	Finalist	
2024	Edwidge Danticat	We’re Alone	Finalist	
2025	Karen Hao	Empire of AI: Dreams and Nightmares in Sam Altman's OpenAI	Winner	
2025	Greg Grandin	America, América: A New History of the New World	Finalist	
2025	Barbara Demick	Daughters of the Bamboo Grove: From China to America, a True Story of Abduction, Adoption, and Separated Twins	Finalist	
2025	Scott Anderson	King of Kings: The Iranian Revolution, a Story of Hubris, Delusion and Catastrophic Miscalculation	Finalist	
2025	Gardiner Harris	No More Tears: The Dark Secrets of Johnson & Johnson	Finalist	

== See also ==
- Ivan Sandrof Lifetime Achievement Award
- John Leonard Prize
- National Book Critics Circle Awards
- National Book Critics Circle Award for Biography
- National Book Critics Circle Award for Criticism
- National Book Critics Circle Award for Fiction
- National Book Critics Circle Award for Memoir and Autobiography
- National Book Critics Circle Award for Poetry
- Nona Balakian Citation for Excellence in Reviewing
