= 13 Stories and 13 Epitaphs =

1991 book by William T. Vollmann

- First edition (UK)
- Author: William T Vollmann
- Language: English
- Publisher: Andre Deutsch (UK); Pantheon Books (US)
- Publication date: 1991
- Publication place: United Kingdom
- Media type: Print (hardback)
- Pages: 318pp
- ISBN: 0233987282
- Preceded by: The Ice-Shirt
- Followed by: Whores for Gloria

13 Stories and 13 Epitaphs is a book of short stories written by William T. Vollmann first published in the UK in 1991. The stories, which are both fictional and semi-autobiographical, traverse a wide range of themes and are punctuated by short mediations on death.
