= Royal Family (disambiguation) =

A royal family is the extended family of a monarch.

Royal Family may also refer to:

- Royal Family (film), a 1969 British documentary film
- Royal Family (TV series), a 2011 South Korean television drama
- The Royal Family (album), a compilation album by Suburban Noize Records
- The Royal Family (novel), by William T. Vollmann
- The Royal Family (play), by George S. Kaufman and Edna Ferber
- The Royal Family (TV series), American television series
- Singer Paul Young's backing group
- The Royal Family Dance Crew, one of New Zealand dancer Parris Goebel's dance crews

== See also ==
- Dynasty
- King family (disambiguation)
- Royal household
- The Royle Family, a British television series by Caroline Aherne and Craig Cash
