= EMILYs List =

American political organization

- Formation: 1985; 41 years ago
- Founder: Ellen Malcolm
- Purpose: To elect Democratic women in favor of abortion rights to political office
- Headquarters: Washington, D.C., U.S.
- President: Jessica Mackler
- Budget: $61.6 million (2024)
- Revenue: $62.5 million (2024)
- Website: emilyslist.org

EMILYs List, formerly stylized as EMILY's List, is an American political action committee (PAC) that aims to help elect Democratic female candidates in favor of abortion rights to office. It was founded by Ellen Malcolm in 1985. The group's name is a backronym for "Early Money Is Like Yeast", alluding to the way yeast makes dough rise. The saying refers to a convention of political fundraising: receiving many donations early in a race helps attract subsequent donors. EMILYs List bundles contributions to the campaigns of Democratic women in favor of abortion rights running in targeted races.

From 1985 through 2008, EMILYs List raised $240 million for political candidates. EMILYs List spent $27.4 million in 2010, $34 million in 2012, and $44.9 million in 2014. The organization raised $47.86 million for the 2016 election cycle, much of it earmarked for Hillary Clinton, whose presidential bid EMILYs List had endorsed. In the 2020 and 2024 election cycles, the organization raised $80.61 million and $60.25 million respectively.

== History and mission ==
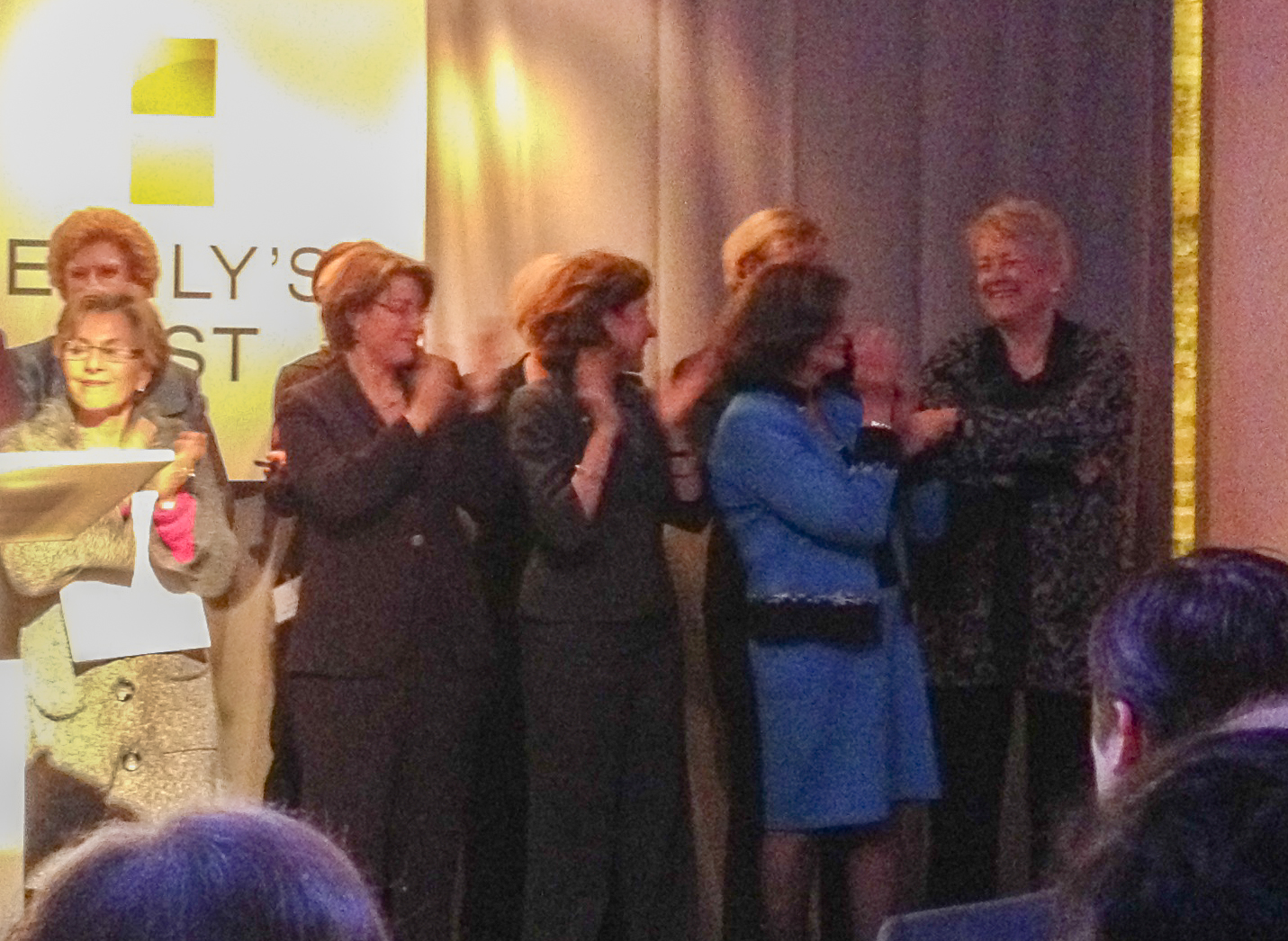
Ellen Malcolm attending an EMILY's List event.

EMILYs List was founded in 1985 when 25 women met in the home of Ellen Malcolm. Founding members included Barbara Boxer, Ann Richards, Anne Wexler, and Donna Shalala. In 1986, early financial support from EMILYs List helped elect Barbara Mikulski of Maryland, the first female Democrat elected to the U.S. Senate in her own right (not appointed or filling a seat of a deceased husband).

The group's mission is to cultivate a donor network to raise money for female Democratic candidates in favor of abortion rights. To become an official EMILYs List member, an individual must pay $100 to join EMILYs List and agree to donate a minimum of $100 each to two U.S. Senate, U.S. House, or gubernatorial candidates. Members donate directly to EMILYs List, which bundles the checks together and forwards them to candidates.

In her book, When Women Win: EMILYs List and the Rise of Women in American Politics, Ellen Malcolm, the organization's founder, stated that "creating progressive policies and promoting them can be incredibly valuable. But those policies will never be implemented unless enough politicians are elected who support them." They focused specifically on women in favor of abortion rights because they felt that "women couldn't be equal until they had control over their bodies."

They focused on raising early money for women because women were not getting money from the Democratic party and thus were generally not winning races even if they were qualified, and they felt that early money could help convince people that their campaigns were credible and would help them raise more money later. For the 2006 election cycle, EMILYs List raised about $46 million for candidates and the group was listed as the biggest PAC in the nation by Political Money Line. EMILYs List endorsed 31 candidates in 2006, eight of whom were victorious.

In 2008, EMILYs List endorsed 22 U.S. House candidates, two U.S. Senate candidates, and three gubernatorial contenders. The PAC helped elect two new female senators, Kay Hagan of North Carolina and Jeanne Shaheen of New Hampshire, and supported the gubernatorial election of Bev Perdue of North Carolina, the re-election of Gov. Christine Gregoire of Washington, and the successful elections of twelve new women to the United States House of Representatives. EMILYs List criteria for picking candidates include staff recommendations, viability, "demographics and history of the district, analysis of opponents or potential opponents, analysis of candidate's education, political experience, etc., demonstrated success at fund-raising, poll data to demonstrate name recognition and grass roots support."

== Leadership and Staff ==
Ellen Malcolm served as president of EMILYs List from its founding until 2010. Stephanie Schriock was chosen to succeed Malcolm, who became chairwoman of the board of directors. Malcolm is now listed on the EMILYs List website as "Founder and Chair Emerita." Schriock announced she would step down in late 2020, following 11 years at the organization. Laphonza Butler took over as president of EMILYs List in 2021, leaving in October 2023 to fill the remainder of the late Dianne Feinstein's U.S. Senate term. Political strategist Jessica Mackler was selected as interim president following Butler's Senate appointment, and her position as fourth president of EMILYs List was made permanent in March 2024.

Michelle White, previously the organization's chief of staff, became the current executive director in August 2025. Amy Dacey was the executive director of EMILYs List from 2010 through 2013, when she left to become the executive director of the Democratic National Committee. Former Center for American Progress Executive Director Jess O'Connell served as executive director for EMILYs List from 2014 to 2017, after which she transitioned to a role as CEO of the Democratic National Committee. Emily Cain served as Executive Director from 2017 through 2023.

The organization's board of directors is, as of October 2026, composed of Ellen Malcolm, Rebecca Haile, Yolanda Caraway, Yvette Nicole Brown, Wendy Davis (politician), Monica Dixon, Glenda Glover, Wendy Greuel, Judith L. Lichtman, Jennifer Lin, Sara Min, Joyce Newstat, Catherine Pino, Deborah Simon, and Gretchen Sisson. The board has previously included Karla Jurvetson, Maya Harris, Mary Ann (Andy) Holland, María Teresa Kumar, Donald Sussman, and Michael Tubbs.

== Programs ==
The Political Opportunity Program (POP) was established in 2001 to encourage Democratic women in favor of abortion rights to run for state and local office. POP targets its resources toward Democratic women in favor of abortion rights running for state legislatures, state constitutional offices, and local offices.

=== Women Vote! ===
In 1995, EMILYs List began a program called Women Vote! to promote a higher voter turnout among women. Women Vote! is Emily's List's independent expenditure arm communicating directly with voters.

== Criticism ==
Critics would like to see EMILYs List expand its definition of "women's issues" to include economic issues like a higher minimum wage and expanded Social Security. Others have said that the group needs to focus its resources better, staying out of races where there is already an incumbent progressive Democrat and concentrating on other races instead. Democrat Marcy Kaptur criticized EMILYs List for being too narrow in focus by emphasizing abortion rights over other progressive issues, such as the minimum wage, that also affect women.

EMILYs List in the past has received some criticism for how much money they are accepting and where that money is going to as being a Political Action Committee or PAC. In Nick Hoffman's article EMILYs List v. FEC he discusses EMILYs List as a non-profit that has had trouble with the Federal Election Commission or FEC. Hoffman accuses EMILYs List of arguing with the FEC over how much money should be allowed to be given to campaigns. EMILYs List has been criticized for pushing the allowance of no limit on how much money can be donated to campaigns.

== Endorsements ==
=== Endorsed candidates ===
EMILYs List provides training, recruits women to run, and endorses and funds female political candidates. EMILYs List is listed as an "important source of candidate support," in a 2010 article in the Harvard International Review.

=== Presidential ===
During the 2008 Democratic presidential primaries, EMILYs List supported Hillary Clinton over Barack Obama and bundled $855,518 for Clinton, making the group one of the five largest donors to her 2008 campaign. When NARAL endorsed Barack Obama over Hillary Clinton, EMILYs List was strongly critical. EMILYs List President Ellen Malcolm said, "I think it is tremendously disrespectful to Sen. Clinton - who held up the nomination of a FDA commissioner in order to force approval of Plan B and who spoke so eloquently during the Supreme Court nomination about the importance of protecting Roe vs. Wade - to not give her the courtesy to finish the final three weeks of the primary process. It certainly must be disconcerting for elected leaders who stand up for reproductive rights and expect the choice community will stand with them." After the conclusion of the Democratic presidential primaries, EMILYs List moved their support to Barack Obama and was vocal in their opposition to the McCain/Palin ticket.

In 2013, EMILYs List launched its Madam President campaign, saying, "There is a mandate for women's leadership in this country. But we have yet to break through the final glass ceiling and put a woman at the top of the Democratic ticket and into the Presidency." Accordingly, EMILYs List endorsed Hillary Clinton for president on April 12, 2015 within hours of Clinton forming an exploratory committee to run for president. Madam President came to house the former social media presences of Ready for Hillary PAC, which did grassroots organizing in preparation for Hillary Clinton's presidential candidacy.

In the 2020 Democratic presidential primaries EMILYs List endorsed Senator Elizabeth Warren the day before Super Tuesday. In August 2020, EMILYs List issued a "Statement on Biden-Harris Ticket" that said the organization was "thrilled to see Kamala Harris named to the ticket" and that "the contrast to the Trump-Pence administration couldn't be more stark," though the statement did not explicitly endorse the Biden-Harris ticket.

In June 2023, EMILYs list joined other pro-choice organizations, including Planned Parenthood and NARAL, in endorsing Joe Biden's reelection campaign. Following this endorsement, the three organizations held a joint rally with Biden, Kamala Harris, and the Democratic National Committee in Washington on the anniversary of the decision in Dobbs v. Jackson Women's Health Organization. In July 2024, EMILYs List endorsed Kamala Harris for president on the same day as the withdrawal of Joe Biden from the 2024 United States presidential election. EMILYs List pledged to spend at least $20 million to support Harris's candidacy.

=== 2012 ===
In 2012, 80% of the candidates endorsed by EMILYs List in the general election won a seat.

=== 2014 ===
In the 2014 election cycle, EMILYs List endorsed 24 U.S. House candidates, six U.S. Senate candidates, and six gubernatorial candidates. Of these 40 candidates endorsed by EMILYs List, 42.5% won.

=== 2018 ===
In the 2018 election, EMILYs List endorsed eight women in gubernatorial races, 12 for the U.S. Senate, and 64 candidates for the House of Representatives.

== Similar groups ==
Similar groups have formed along the same lines as EMILYs List, with some slight variations. In 1994, Joan Kirner created a similar organization in Australia by the name EMILY's List Australia. Political activist and former school teacher Amy Laufer founded Virginia's List, a political group supporting Democratic women running for office in Virginia. EMILYs List's conservative counterparts include: The Wish List, which supports Republican women in favor of abortion rights; Susan B. Anthony Pro-Life America, an anti-abortion PAC that supports women who oppose abortion; and Maggie's List, a PAC founded in Florida in 2010 to "raise awareness and funds to increase the number of conservative women elected to federal public office."
