= Paul de Ladmirault =

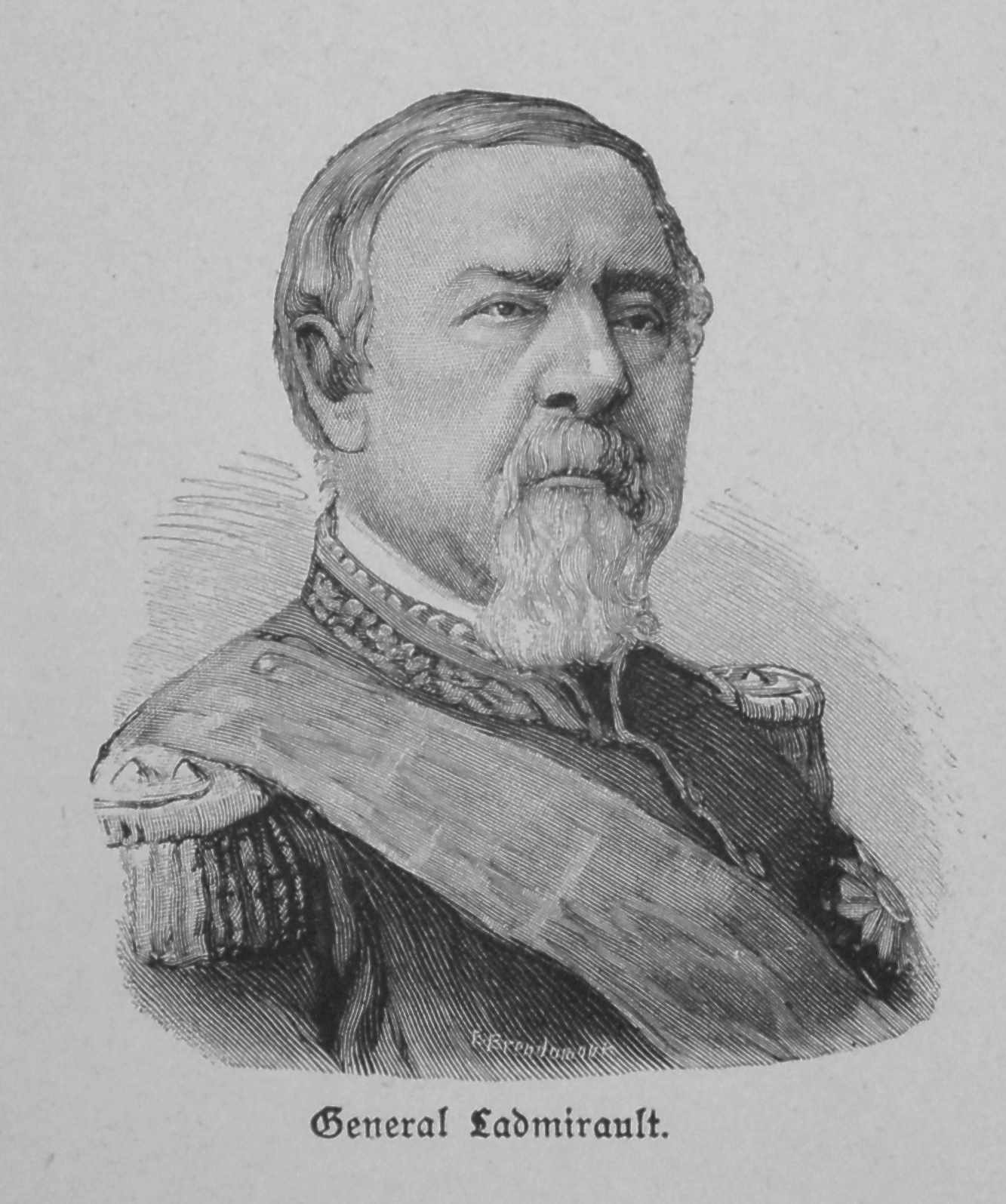
General de Ladmirault

Paul de Ladmirault (17 February 1808, in Montmorillon – 1 February 1898, in Sillars) was a French general active in the French conquest of Algeria and during the wars of the Second French Empire.

== Life ==
Ladmirault was born on 17 February 1808 at Montmorillon to an old family belonging to the Poitou minor aristocracy. His father had fled France during the French Revolution. Ladmirault entered the prestigious Saint-Cyr Military School in 1826 (in the same class as the future Marshal of France François Certain Canrobert). Upon his graduation in 1829, he was commissioned a second lieutenant in the 62nd Line Infantry Regiment. In 1831 he was promoted to lieutenant in the 67th Regiment before being sent to Algeria, where he spent the next 22 years.

He was promoted to the post of adjudant-major in 1834, then to captain in the Zouaves in 1837, and finally major in 1840. In the same year he was transferred to the 2nd Battalion of Light Infantry and placed in charge of the region of Cherchell. He was made lieutenant colonel in 1842, full colonel in the Zouaves in 1844 and général de brigade in June 1848, being placed in command of Médéa Province. In 1852 he was recalled to France, and promoted général de division on 14 January 1853. He participated in the Italian war of 1859, commanding the 2nd division of I Corps under Marshal Achille Baraguey d'Hilliers, and taking part in the Battle of Solferino, during which he was wounded twice.

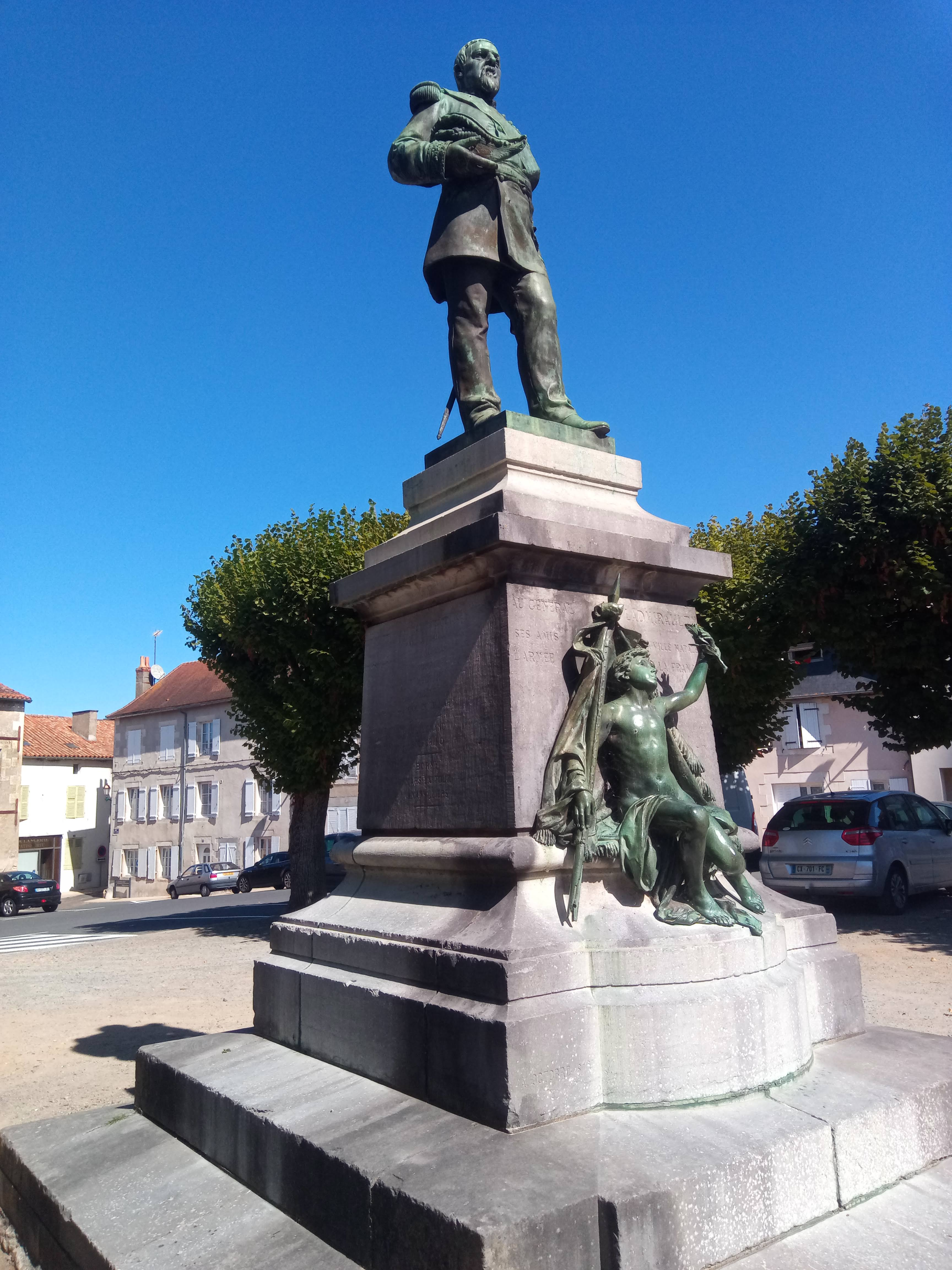
Paul de Ladmirault's statue in his home town of Montmorillon

In 1863 he was made commander of the 2nd division of the French Imperial Guard, in 1865 he was appointed deputy governor of French Algeria and the named Senator in 1866. After a period as commander of the military camp at Châlons, he assumed command of II Corps at Lille in 1867. During the Franco-Prussian War he was placed in command of the IV Corps of the Army of the Rhine, taking part in the battles of Mars-la-Tour and Saint-Privat; during the latter he repulsed the German attack at Amanvillers. After the capitulation of the Bazaine's army however, he became a Prussian prisoner of war.

He was freed in order to take part in the assault against the Paris Commune, during which he led the assault against the Gate of Saint-Ouen and Montmartre. After the suppression of the Commune, he was named military governor of Paris, a post he held until 1878. He also succeeded Marshal Mac-Mahon as commander of the Army of Versailles when the latter became President of France. He ran unsuccessfully in the 1879 Presidential election, and died on 1 February 1898 at Sillars.

== Decorations ==
- Legion of Honour :
1. Knight in 1840
2. Officer in 1845
3. Commander in 1847
4. Grand Officer in 1859
5. Grand Cross in 1867
- Médaille militaire in 1871
- Order of Saints Maurice and Lazarus

== Sources ==
- J. de la Faye : le général de Ladmirault (1808-1898) (Paris vers 1900)
- Maguy Gallet-Villechange : Le général Paul de Ladmirault, un enfant du Poitou sous les aigles impériales (Anovi, 2008).
