= Irene's Cunt =

1928 novel by Louis Aragon/Albert de Routisie

Irene's Cunt (French: Le Con d'Irène) is a short erotic novel written by the French poet and novelist Louis Aragon under the pseudonym Albert de Routisie, first published in 1928. Its title is rendered in English variously as Irene or Irene's Cunt. Jean-Jacques Pauvert has called the novel "one of the four or five most beautiful poetic works produced by surrealism".

The novel details the life of a man through his adulthood to old age and the latter half of the text concerns his inner thoughts after he has lost his ability to speak and move due to syphilis.

The first edition was illustrated with etchings by André Masson which were aesthetically very similar to those of Georges Bataille's Story of the Eye. Régine Deforges republished it in 1968 under the title Irène, which did not prevent its seizure as pornography.

American novelist William T. Vollmann has cited Irene's Cunt as an influence for his novel The Royal Family. It was adapted by Toméo Vergès for a choreographic work Pas de panique in 1999.
