= The Atlas (novel) =

1996 semi-autobographical work by William T. Vollmann

- First edition
- Author: William T. Vollmann
- Cover artist: Ken Miller
- Language: English
- Genre: Travelogue, memoir
- Publisher: Viking Press
- Publication date: 1996
- Publication place: United States
- ISBN: 0-670-86578-8
- OCLC: 37342277

The Atlas is a 1996 semi-autobiographical work by American novelist William T. Vollmann.

A mixture of fiction and non-fiction, this book was drawn from Vollmann's experiences traveling around the world. He relates these experiences through 53 interconnected stories that weave their way through the novel.

Vollmann has said that Yasunari Kawabata's Palm-of-the-Hand Stories were an important influence on the structure of the collection. Several of the short stories share the same titles as some of Vollmann's earlier novels, such as Fathers and Crows, Butterfly Stories and The Rifles; he describes these as miniature versions of the larger works.

The stories in the first half of the book are numbered from one to 26 until the central story, also called "The Atlas". In the second half, the stories are numbered in reverse from 26 to one. The pairs of stories created by this system often comment on each other in a variety of ways. In addition to the table of contents, the stories are also listed according to the longitude and latitude of their setting.

When Vollmann went on a literary reading tour following the publication of The Atlas, he gained some notoriety for firing a gun loaded with blanks during his reading of the first story in the collection "The Back of My Head", which is based on an experience Vollmann had in the former Yugoslavia during wartime.
