= The Rainbow Stories =

Book by William T. Vollmann

- First edition (UK)
- Author: William T Vollmann
- Language: English
- Publisher: Andre Deutsch (UK); Atheneum Books (US)
- Publication date: January 1989 (UK); July 1989 (US)
- Publication place: United States
- Media type: Print (hardback & paperback)
- Pages: 544pp
- ISBN: 978-0-689-11961-3
- Preceded by: You Bright and Risen Angels
- Followed by: The Ice-Shirt

The Rainbow Stories is a collection of short stories about American culture written by William T. Vollmann and published in 1989. Written in the style of narrative journalism, it was his second published fictional work, preceded by You Bright and Risen Angels. The book consists of thirteen interlocking stories (based on the colours of the rainbow) that range in scope from ancient Babylon to modern San Francisco. Steven Moore wrote of the book that "Vollmann's verbal prowess, empathy, and astonishing range put him in a class apart from his contemporaries." Robert Rebein described the book as a "real breakthrough" for Vollman, stating: "[Rainbow Stories is] a book that mixed reportorial and fictional techniques to powerfully evoke the lives of prostitutes and skinheads on the streets of San Francisco's Tenderloin district."

== Contents ==
The 13 stories included in the book are:

- "The Visible Spectrum"
- "The White Knights"
- "Red Hands"
- "Ladies and Red Lights"
- "Scintillant Orange"
- "Yellow Rose"
- "The Yellow Sugar"
- "The Green Dress"
- "The Blue Wallet"
- "The Blue Yonder"
- "The Indigo Engineers"
- "Violet Hair"
- "X-Ray Visions"
