= The Book of Dolores =

2013 book

- Author: William T. Vollman
- Genre: Art
- Publisher: powerHouse Books
- Publication date: 2013

The Book of Dolores is a book of photographs and paintings exploring femininity written by William T. Vollmann and published in 2013 by powerHouse Books. Vollmann began seriously cross-dressing in 2008 and developed a female alter ego named Dolores. "'Dolores is a relatively young woman trapped in this fat, aging male body,' Mr. Vollmann said. 'I’ve bought her a bunch of clothes, but she’s not grateful. She would like to get rid of me if she could.'"

Vollmann is a heterosexual, married and a father. He describes the transformation as a vision quest to get into the mind of a female character he was writing, but also has mentioned liking the feel of women's clothes. His experimentation in cross-dressing started in the late 1980s, while living in San Francisco and writing Seven Dreams, about the settlement of North America. He was particularly interested in an Inuit myth about a brother transforming into a woman. Later he wrote about cross-dresser clubs in Japan. "'I had always imagined femininity as what you’re born with, what’s between your legs,' he said, 'And then I realized: no, it’s a performance. It’s about how you move, all the things you do to get ready.'"

== Criticism ==
Stephanie Burt, reviewing the work in The New Yorker, has said that Vollman is more confident about the photographic process in the work than the things that go into performing femininity. "What if he had treated the arts of femininity with the same attention he gives to the arts of photography? Maybe he did, however his prose does not reflect it: instead, he comes off, by the end, as an anxious mansplainer, uneasy about the feminine subject he has chosen."
