= The Dying Grass =

Book by William T. Vollmann

- First edition
- Author: William T. Vollmann
- Language: English
- Series: Seven Dreams: A Book of North American Landscapes
- Published: 2015
- Publisher: Viking
- Publication place: United States
- Media type: Print (hardcover and paperback)
- Pages: 1,376
- ISBN: 978-0670015986
- Preceded by: The Poison Shirt
- Followed by: The Rifles

The Dying Grass is a 2015 novel by William T. Vollmann. The novel concerns the Nez Perce War of 1877. At 1,376 pages, it is Vollmann's longest single-volume published work.

The novel is the fifth book in Vollman's series Seven Dreams: A Book of North American Landscapes.
