= Ellen Malcolm =

American activist (born 1947)

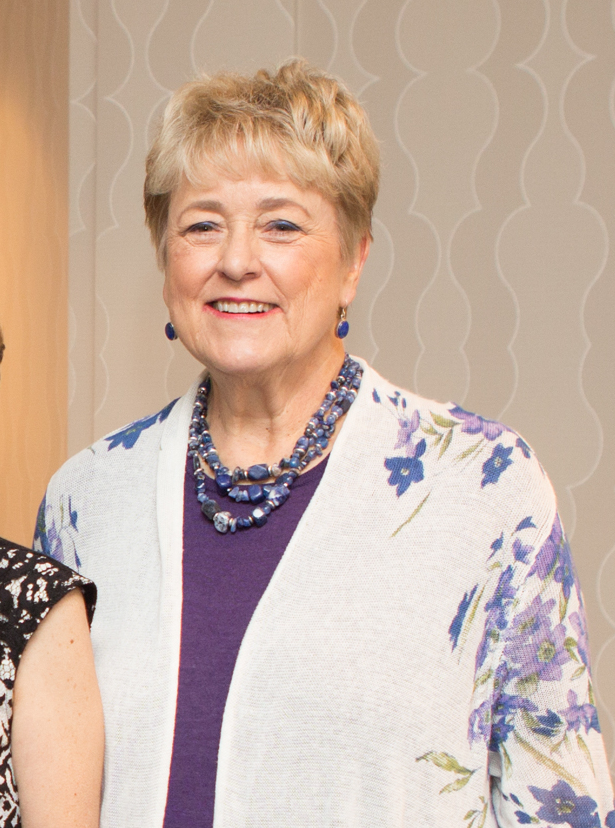
- Malcolm in 2015
- Born: February 2, 1947 (age 79)
- Education: Hollins College (BA); George Washington University (MBA)
- Occupation: Activist
- Board member of: EMILYs List (founder)

Ellen R. Malcolm (born February 2, 1947) is an American activist with a long career in American politics, particularly in political fundraising. She founded EMILYs List in 1985 and served as its president until 2010.

== Early life ==
Malcolm's great-grandfather is A. Ward Ford, an IBM founder.

Malcolm grew up in Montclair, New Jersey, the daughter of parents who met while working in the sales department at IBM. After her father died when she was 8 months old, she became the heir to an IBM fortune, which she was to inherit at age 21. Malcolm attended Montclair Kimberley Academy, graduating in the class of 1965. Upon entering Hollins College, an all women's school, in 1965 Malcolm says she was "apolitical" and didn't even realize the country was at war. She went to work for the campaign of Eugene McCarthy in 1968. McCarthy was a Democratic and anti-war senator for the state of Minnesota. After he won the popular vote in the Democratic presidential primary, Malcolm was eager to become more involved in politics. Malcolm cites the Vietnam War, the assassination of Martin Luther King Jr. and the riots that followed, the assassination of Robert F. Kennedy, and the counterculture of the 1960s as the factors that led to her political awakening. Though both of her parents and much of her community were Republican, Malcolm says the turmoil of the time was shocking, and she felt compelled to help make a change. In the summer of 1968 she began volunteering at the Manpower Development Program in Newark. After graduating from Hollins College in 1969, she worked for Common Cause in the 1970s.

== Political activism ==
Malcolm began working for Common Cause in the very early stages of the organization. She was charged with overseeing a number of volunteers who were putting pressure on representatives to end the Vietnam War. Malcolm credits her time at Common Cause with teaching her the "nuts and bolts" of campaigning.

Malcolm became the press secretary of the National Women's Political Caucus after leaving Common Cause. Through her work at the NWPC, she came to know Lael Stegall, the development director for the organization. Stegall expressed her interest to advise wealthy philanthropic women on where to direct their money. Malcolm, inheriting her fortune at age 21, was just such a woman. Malcolm's interest in giving money to worthy non-profits conflicted with her desire to advance her career based on her own merit, rather than her deep pockets. With Stegall as the executive director, together they started the Windom Fund in 1980.

After leaving the NWPC in 1979, Malcolm found work as the press secretary for Esther Peterson, who was then the special assistant for consumer affairs for the Carter administration. Malcolm cites both Peterson and Millie Jeffries, the head of the NWPC, as major influences on her political beliefs.

In 1982, Malcolm became involved with the campaign of Harriet Woods, a Democratic woman running for a spot in the US Senate. Woods lost the seat due to running out of funds a few weeks before the election, causing her television ads to lose air time. Because of her involvement in the campaign, Malcolm discovered that not a single woman had been elected to the US Senate, instead they had all been appointed. Malcolm identified the main cause of this to be insufficient funds for women's campaigns.

In 1983, Malcolm hosted a breakfast for a small number of women that she knew were interested in political activism. Together, they identified a clear goal: use early funds or seed money to elect a woman to the US Senate. This was the beginning of EMILY's List, which Malcolm founded in 1985. EMILY's list effectively set up a donor network composed mostly of women who, in exchange for their money, got information about whom to vote for from people they knew had similar interests to themselves. These interests were clear: elect pro-choice democratic women to public office.

In 2007, she served as co-chair of Hillary Clinton's election campaign, and in 2010 she was appointed to the National Park Foundation Board of Directors.

Malcolm served as president of America Coming Together from 2003 to 2004.

Malcolm is Chair Emerita of the board of EMILY's list, former Chair of the National Partnership for Women and Families, and a former member of the board of directors for the National Park Foundation.

== Book ==
Malcolm, along with Craig Unger, wrote When Women Win: EMILY's List and the Rise of Women in American Politics, published in 2016.

== Accolades ==
She was named one of the Women of the Year by Glamour (1992), one of America's most influential women by Vanity Fair (1998), one of the 100 Most Important Women in America by Ladies' Home Journal (1999), one of Time magazine's 50 Women Who Made American Political History (2017), and Most Valuable Player by the American Association of Political Consultants, and given the Margaret Sanger Award by the Planned Parenthood Federation of America.
