= Joseph Carré =

French-Uruguayan architect

Joseph Paul Adrien Carré (Montmorillon, France, 18 March 1870 – 2 March 1941) was a French architect practicing in Uruguay.

== Literature ==
- Lucchini, Aurelio (1969). Ideas y formas en la arquitectura nacional. Colección Nuestra Tierra (in Spanish). Vol. 6. Montevideo.
- Lucchini, Aurelio (1986). El Concepto de Arquitectura y su traducción a formas en el territorio que hoy pertenece a Uruguay (in Spanish). Montevideo: Universidad de la República.
