= Régine Deforges =

French film director and writer

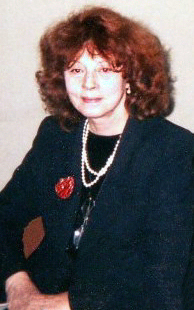
- Régine Deforges (1996)
- Born: 15 August 1935; Montmorillon, France
- Died: 3 April 2014 (aged 78); Paris, France
- Occupation: Writer
- Known for: La Bicyclette bleue

Régine Deforges (15 August 1935 – 3 April 2014) was a French author, editor, director, and playwright. Her book La Bicyclette bleue was the most popular book in France in 2000 and it was known by some to be offensive and to others for its plagiarism, neither of which was proved.

== Life ==
Deforges was born in Montmorillon, Vienne, Deforges is sometimes called the High Priestess of French erotic literature. Deforges was the first woman to own and operate a publishing house in France. Over the years, she has been censored, prosecuted, and heavily fined for publishing "offensive" literature, beginning with Louis Aragon: Irene's Cunt.

One of her novels, La Bicyclette bleue (The Blue Bicycle), published in 1981, was France's biggest bestseller. In 2000, it was made into a television series. A story of love, obsession, and survival set during the turmoil of World War II, it developed into a successful series of seven books. La Bicyclette bleue would go on to cause a major international intellectual property court case. In the initial ruling, Deforges was found guilty of plagiarizing Margaret Mitchell's famous novel Gone with the Wind. Deforges freely admitted that the first 70 pages were inspired by Mitchell's novel but the whole book was 1200 pages long. She won her case on appeal, and the ruling ordering her to pay damages was reversed. She was formerly president of the Société des Gens de Lettres de France and a member of the Prix Femina jury. She lived in Paris.

Deforges transformed her home town into a "City of Writing". It has had museums and bookshops with that theme since 2000. The idea that Montmorillon should be a Book town came from Deforges who was then a local councillor. The town had a history of paper-making and her idea received both local and international support. The old medieval quarter of the town attracted six million euros of funding and now brands itself as a book town.

== Bibliography ==
=== Novels and short stories ===
- O m'a dit ("O Told Me"), conversations with the author of Story of O (1975)
- Blanche et Lucie ("Blanche and Lucie"), short story about her two grandmothers (Fayard, 1976)
- Le Cahier volé ("The Stolen Folder"), short story partly inspired by a childhood spent at the École Saint-Martial de Montmorillon (Fayard, 1978)
- Les Contes pervers ("Perverse Tales"), her first erotic work (1980), later adapted for cinema
- La Révolte des nonnes ("The Nuns' Revolt", Fayard, 1981), adapted for television as L'Enfant des Loups ("Child of Wolves") in 1991
- Les Enfants de Blanche ("Blanche's Children"), a sequel to Blanche et Lucie (1982)
- Sur les bords de la Gartempe ("On the Banks of the Gartempe"), comprising Blanche et Lucie, Les Enfants de Blanche and Le Cahier volé
- Lola et quelques autres ("Lola and a Few Others"), short story collection (Fayard, 1983)
- L'Orage, ("The Storm", Éditions Blanche, 1986)
- Pour l'amour de Marie Salat ("For Love of Marie Salat", Albin Michel, 1987)
- Sous le ciel de Novgorod ("Under the Skies of Novgorod", Fayard, 1989)
- Troubles de femmes ("Women's Troubles"), short story (Éditions Spengler, 1994)
- Journal d'un éditeur ("An Editor's Journal")
- Rencontres ferroviaires ("Railroad Meetings", Fayard, 1999)
- La petite fille au manteau rose ("The Little Girl in the Pink Jacket"), short story in Chemin faisant, a collection of stories set on public transport (Le Serpent à plumes, 2001)
- La Hire, ou la colère de Jeanne ("La Hire, or the Fury of Joan"), historical novel about Joan of Arc
- Le collier de perles ("The Pearl Necklace", Albin Michel) ISBN 2-226-15510-4 / 2006 : Le Livre de Poche (LGF) ISBN 2-253-11767-6 / 2004

=== La Bicyclette bleue ===
- 1981: La Bicyclette bleue (The Blue Bicycle, Fayard) / 1987 : Le Livre de Poche (LGF)
- 1983: 101, avenue Henri Martin (No. 101, Henri Martin Avenue, Fayard) / 1987 : Le Livre de Poche (LGF)
- 1985: Le Diable en rit encore (The Devil's Still Laughing About It, Fayard) / 1988 : Le Livre de Poche (LGF)
- 1991: Noir tango (Black Tango, Fayard) / 1993 : Le Livre de Poche (LGF)
- 1994: Rue de la Soie (Silk Road, Fayard) / 1996 : Le Livre de Poche (LGF)
- 1996: La Dernière colline (The Final Hill, Fayard) / 1999 : Le Livre de Poche (LGF)
- 1999: Cuba libre! (To the Freedom of Cuba!, Fayard) / 2001 : Le Livre de Poche (LGF)
- 2001: Alger, ville blanche (Algiers, White City, Fayard) / 2003 : Le Livre de Poche (LGF)
- 2003: Les Généraux du crépuscule (The Generals of Twilight, Fayard) / 2005 : Le Livre de Poche (LGF)
- 2007: Et quand vient la fin du voyage (And When the Trip is Over, Fayard)

=== Essays ===
- Entre femmes ("Among Women", Éditions Blanche/Robert Laffont 1999)
- Fragments ("Fragments", France Loisirs, 1997)
- Les Non-dits de Régine Deforges ("My Taboos", Stock, 1997)
- Roger Stéphane ou la passion d'admirer ("Roger Stéphane, or the Drive to Admire", Fayard/Éditions Spengler, 1995)
- Camilo ("Camilo", Fayard, 1999)

=== Anthologies ===
- Les Cent plus beaux cris de femmes ("The Hundred Most Beautiful Cries of Women", Cherche-Midi Éditeur, 1980)
- La Chanson d'amour, petite anthologie ("The Love Song", Éditions Mango-Images, 1999)
- Poèmes de femmes ("Poems by Women", Cherche-Midi Éditeur, 1993)

=== Tales ===
- Léa au pays des dragons, ("Léa in the Land of Dragons", 1982)
- L'Apocalypse de saint Jean ("The Apocalypse of St John", Éditions Ramsay, 1985)
- L'Arche de Noé de grand-mère ("Grandmother's Noah's Ark", Éditions Calligram, 1995)
- Léa au pays des dragons (réédition par Nathan, 1991)
- Léa et les diables ("Léa and the Demons", Seuil, 1991)
- Léa et les fantômes ("Léa and the Ghosts", Seuil, 1992)
- Le Couvent de sœur Isabelle ("The Convent of Sister Isabelle", Seuil, 1992)
- Les Chiffons de Lucie ("Lucie's Scraps", Éditions Calligram, 1993)
- Les Poupées de grand-mère ("Grandmother's Dolls", Stock, 1994)

== Filmography ==
- Contes Pervers (aka Les Filles de Madame Claude / Erotic Tales; director, 1980)
