= Montmorillon =

- Subprefecture and commune
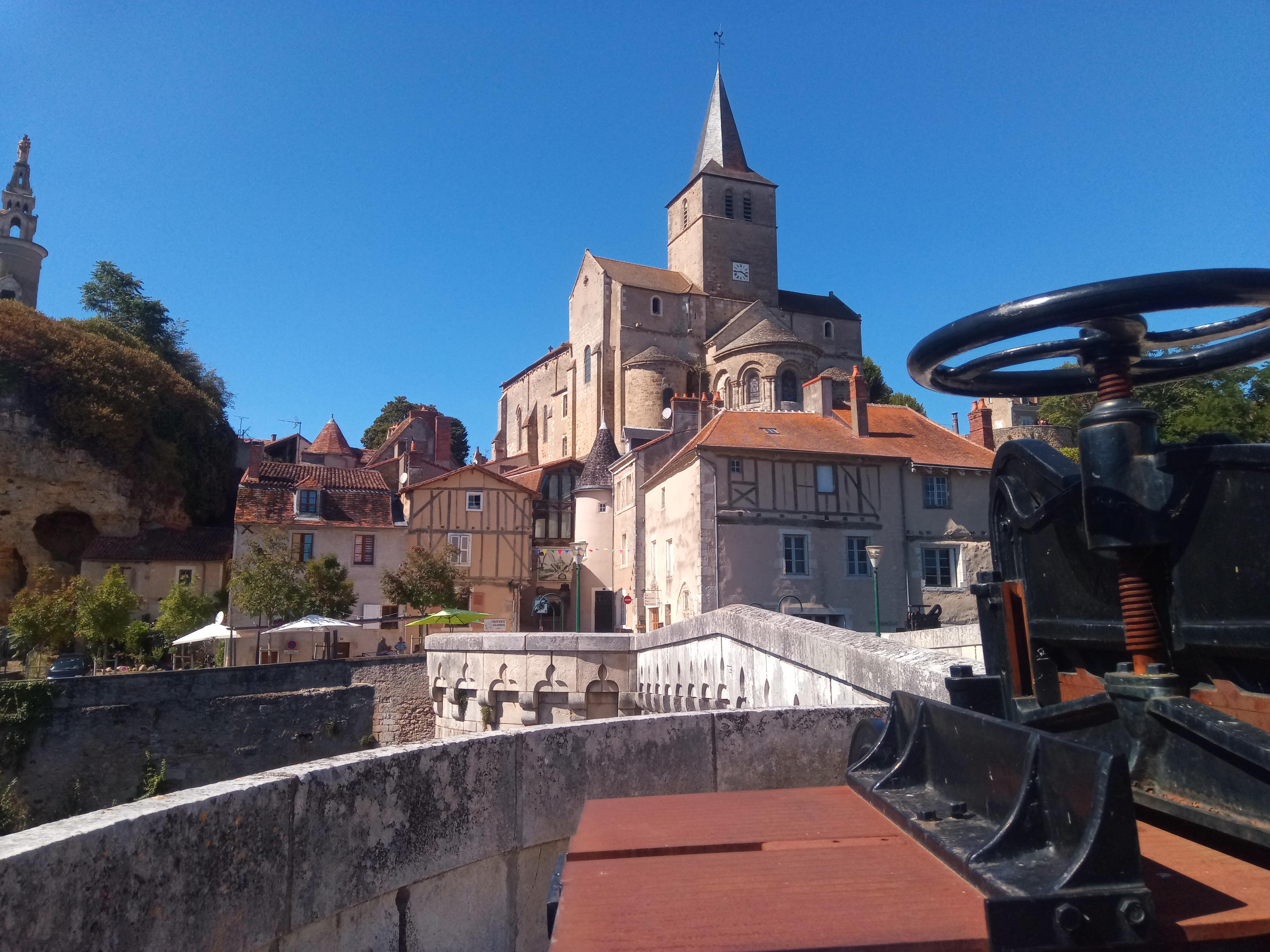
- View of the apse of the Notre Dame Church and Le Vieux-Pont

- Coat of arms
- Location of Montmorillon
- Location within France Location within Nouvelle-Aquitaine
- Coordinates: 46°25′37″N 0°52′18″E
- Country: France
- Region: Nouvelle-Aquitaine
- Department: Vienne
- Arrondissement: Montmorillon
- Canton: Montmorillon

Government
  - Mayor (2020–2026): Bernard Blanchet
- Area^{1}: 57 km^{2} (22 sq mi)
- Elevation: 105 m (344 ft)
- Highest elevation: 168 m (551 ft)
- Lowest elevation: 82 m (269 ft)
- Population (2023): 5,821
  - Density: 100/km^{2} (260/sq mi)
- Time zone: UTC+01:00 (CET)
  - Summer (DST): UTC+02:00 (CEST)
- INSEE/Postal code: 86165 /86500
- ^{1} French Land Register data, which excludes lakes, ponds, glaciers > 1 km^{2} (0.386 sq mi or 247 acres) and river estuaries.

Montmorillon (French pronunciation: [mɔ̃mɔʁijɔ̃]) is a commune in central-western France, in the Vienne department of which it is a sub-prefecture, in Nouvelle-Aquitaine. Its inhabitants are called Montmorillonnaises and Montmorillonnais.

Montmorillon is a Book town and it is branded as the "City of Writing". The town has several writing-inspired museums and bookshops covering several genres.

== History ==
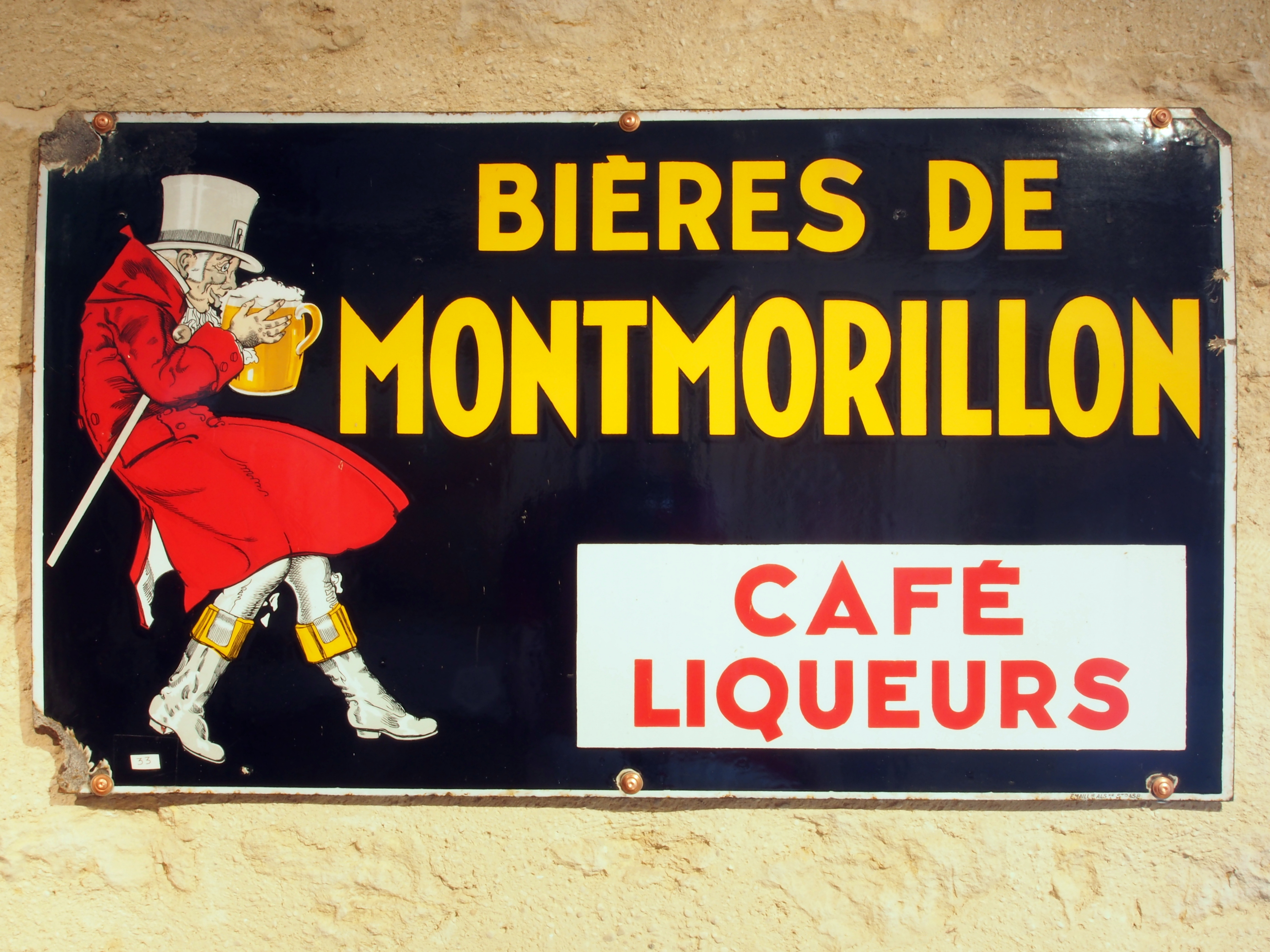
"Bières de Montmorillon"

The town was once known for paper making, but in the nineteenth century the mill and its plentiful supply of clean water were repurposed to making the "Beer of Montmorillon". The beer was made from 1848 and sold to drinkers who rejected the usual drink of red wine. The family-run business continued to 1963, leaving several abandoned buildings. In 2015, the brewery opened again.

The clay mineral montmorillonite was named after Montmorillon after its discovery there in 1847.

Montmorillon is branded as the "City of Writing" as it has had museums and bookshops with that theme since 2000. The idea that Montmorillon should be a Book town came from Régine Deforges, a local councillor who was a successful, and controversial, author. The town had a history of paper-making, and her idea received local and international support. The old medieval quarter of the town attracted six million euros of funding.

It is also known for its macarons, and there is another museum dedicated to them. The museum was opened in 2003 by the Maison Rannou-Métivier who are the oldest macaron bakery in Montmorillon, dating back to 1920.

The Coopération pédagogique range of educational posters were produced in Montmorillon, in the 1950s by Éditions Rossignol.

On 31 March 2024 (Easter sunday) heavy rainfall led to the severe flooding of the town.

== Le Musée d'Art et d'Histoire de Montmorillon (MAHM) ==
The Museum of Art and History in Montmorillon was created in 1936. After closing for several years, the museum reopened in 2018. Located the right bank of the Gartempe, the museum was once a primary school.

The museum has a collection of regional paintings of the 19th and 20th century. This collection of paintings comprises works by Raoul Carré, Jehan Berjonneau, Alfred Plauzeau, Raoul-Félix Etève, Jeanne Harry-Lorne and Henri-Pierre Lejeune. The subjects depicted by the artists are varied. The majority are portraits but the landscape of the local area is strongly featured with the artists having drawn inspiration both from the landscape of the region and their wider travels.

As well as the painting there are a number of graphic documents, designs by Henri Plisson and water colours by Gratiant Emmanuel.

== Population ==
Historical population

Year	Pop.	±% p.a.
1793	3,121	—
1800	2,843	−1.32%
1806	3,313	+2.58%
1821	3,174	−0.29%
1831	3,608	+1.29%
1836	4,157	+2.87%
1841	4,672	+2.36%
1846	4,768	+0.41%
1851	5,228	+1.86%
1856	4,968	−1.02%
1861	5,130	+0.64%
1866	5,203	+0.28%
1872	5,010	−0.63%
1876	5,105	+0.47%
1881	5,128	+0.09%
1886	5,158	+0.12%
1891	5,268	+0.42%
1896	5,284	+0.06%
1901	5,176	−0.41%

Year	Pop.	±% p.a.
1906	5,051	−0.49%
1911	4,944	−0.43%
1921	4,583	−0.76%
1926	4,766	+0.79%
1931	4,507	−1.11%
1936	4,754	+1.07%
1946	5,410	+1.30%
1954	5,524	+0.26%
1962	5,743	+0.49%
1968	6,034	+0.83%
1975	6,685	+1.47%
1982	6,954	+0.57%
1990	6,667	−0.53%
1999	6,898	+0.38%
2007	6,514	−0.71%
2012	6,258	−0.80%
2017	5,954	−0.99%
2023	5,821	−0.38%

Source: EHESS and INSEE (1968-2023)

== Sister cities ==
- Wadern, Germany, since 1968
- Medina del Campo, Spain, since 1994
- Safané, Burkina Faso, since 1997
- Gościno, Poland, since 2003
- Putna, Romania, since 2013

== Notable people ==
- Étienne de Vignolles, called La Hire (1390-1443), French military commander during the Hundred Years' War
- Paul de Ladmirault (1808-1898) French general and senator,
- Joseph Carré (1870-1941), architect
- Régine Deforges (1935-2014), novelist and local councillor.
- Simon Pagenaud (1984-), Champion Indycar Driver, 2019 Indianapolis 500 winner

== Climate ==
Climate data for Montmorillon (1991–2020 normals, extremes 1990–present)
Month	Jan	Feb	Mar	Apr	May	Jun	Jul	Aug	Sep	Oct	Nov	Dec	Year
Record high °C (°F)	18.5 (65.3)	24.1 (75.4)	25.8 (78.4)	30.1 (86.2)	34.1 (93.4)	40.2 (104.4)	40.5 (104.9)	40.2 (104.4)	38.8 (101.8)	31.5 (88.7)	24.3 (75.7)	18.7 (65.7)	40.5 (104.9)
Mean daily maximum °C (°F)	8.2 (46.8)	9.4 (48.9)	13.3 (55.9)	16.3 (61.3)	20.0 (68.0)	23.8 (74.8)	26.3 (79.3)	26.5 (79.7)	22.5 (72.5)	17.4 (63.3)	11.9 (53.4)	8.7 (47.7)	17.0 (62.6)
Daily mean °C (°F)	5.4 (41.7)	5.8 (42.4)	8.8 (47.8)	11.3 (52.3)	14.9 (58.8)	18.4 (65.1)	20.5 (68.9)	20.6 (69.1)	17.0 (62.6)	13.4 (56.1)	8.6 (47.5)	5.9 (42.6)	12.5 (54.5)
Mean daily minimum °C (°F)	2.6 (36.7)	2.2 (36.0)	4.3 (39.7)	6.3 (43.3)	9.7 (49.5)	13.0 (55.4)	14.7 (58.5)	14.6 (58.3)	11.5 (52.7)	9.3 (48.7)	5.3 (41.5)	3.0 (37.4)	8.0 (46.4)
Record low °C (°F)	−11.5 (11.3)	−15.6 (3.9)	−9.7 (14.5)	−4.3 (24.3)	0.6 (33.1)	6.0 (42.8)	7.9 (46.2)	6.3 (43.3)	2.0 (35.6)	−3.6 (25.5)	−9.1 (15.6)	−10.9 (12.4)	−15.6 (3.9)
Average precipitation mm (inches)	70.3 (2.77)	55.8 (2.20)	55.1 (2.17)	65.6 (2.58)	73.3 (2.89)	64.3 (2.53)	48.1 (1.89)	54.8 (2.16)	58.3 (2.30)	77.8 (3.06)	79.3 (3.12)	79.1 (3.11)	781.8 (30.78)
Average precipitation days (≥ 1.0 mm)	12.2	10.4	10.1	11.2	10.4	8.1	7.0	7.1	8.0	11.0	12.5	12.0	120.0
Mean monthly sunshine hours	70.6	104.3	159.9	191.3	215.6	233.5	259.4	236.8	204.5	136.1	81.1	75.5	1,968.5
Source: Meteociel

== See also ==
- Communes of the Vienne department
