= Europe Central =

2005 novel by William T. Vollmann

- Front cover, hardback edition.
- Author: William Vollmann
- Language: English
- Genre: Historical fiction
- Publisher: Viking Press
- Publication date: 2005
- Publication place: United States
- Media type: Print (hardcover and paperback)
- Pages: 832 pp
- ISBN: 0-670-03392-8
- OCLC: 56911959
- Dewey Decimal: 813/.54 22
- LC Class: PS3572.O395 E97 2005

Europe Central (2005) is a novel by William T. Vollmann that won the U.S. National Book Award for Fiction.

== Plot ==
Set in Central Europe during the 20th century, the novel examines an array of characters, ranging from generals to martyrs, police officers, poets, traitors, artists and musicians. It deals with the moral decisions people make in the most trying of circumstances and offers a perspective on human actions during wartime. Many historical figures appear in the novel, including revolutionary Nadezhda Krupskaya, composer Dmitri Shostakovich, artist Käthe Kollwitz, film director Roman Karmen, poet Anna Akhmatova, SS officer Kurt Gerstein, activists Rosa Luxemburg and Karl Liebknecht, German general Friedrich Paulus, and Soviet general Andrey Vlasov.

In an afterword, Vollmann states that while the novel is heavily researched and mostly features real people, it should be regarded as a work of fiction. He calls it "a series of parables about famous, infamous and anonymous European moral actors at moments of decision." Though largely true to history, a number of anecdotes or details were created by the author, such as the "imaginary love triangle" between Shostakovich, Karmen, and Elena Konstantinovskaya.

== Reception ==
The Times Literary Supplement wrote that Vollmann "has turned to the historical novel and made it his own, fashioning a work which is cinematic in scope, epic in ambition and continuously engaging, [showing] that he is one of the most important and fascinating writers of our time."

The New York Times Book Review described it as his "most welcoming work, possibly his best book… part novel and part stories, virtuoso historical remembrance and focused study of violence."
