= Sillars =

- Commune
- Location of Sillars
- Location within France Location within Nouvelle-Aquitaine
- Coordinates: 46°25′10″N 0°46′12″E
- Country: France
- Region: Nouvelle-Aquitaine
- Department: Vienne
- Arrondissement: Montmorillon
- Canton: Lussac-les-Châteaux

Government
  - Mayor (2020–2026): Patrick Royer
- Area^{1}: 60.79 km^{2} (23.47 sq mi)
- Elevation: 121 m (397 ft)
- Highest elevation: 154 m (505 ft)
- Lowest elevation: 93 m (305 ft)
- Population (2023): 584
  - Density: 9.61/km^{2} (24.9/sq mi)
- Time zone: UTC+01:00 (CET)
  - Summer (DST): UTC+02:00 (CEST)
- INSEE/Postal code: 86262 /86320
- ^{1} French Land Register data, which excludes lakes, ponds, glaciers > 1 km^{2} (0.386 sq mi or 247 acres) and river estuaries.

Sillars (French pronunciation: [silaʁ]) is a commune in the Vienne department in the Nouvelle-Aquitaine region in western France.

== See also ==
- Communes of the Vienne department
