= King family =

The term King family may refer to

- King family (Emmerdale), characters from the Emmerdale TV-series
- The King Family Show, a U.S. television show
- King Family (band), a German band
- a king's family, see royal family
- a family with surname King, see King (surname)
