= Argall: The True Story of Pocahontas and Captain John Smith =

Book by William T. Vollmann

- First edition
- Author: William T. Vollmann
- Cover artist: Theodor de Bry, The Abduction of Pocahontas by Captain Argall, 1655
- Language: English
- Series: Seven Dreams: A Book of North American Landscapes
- Genre: Historical novel
- Publisher: Viking Press
- Publication date: 2001-09-27
- Publication place: Author: United States
- Media type: Print (hardback & paperback)
- Pages: 736 pp
- ISBN: 0-670-91030-9
- OCLC: 45951560
- Dewey Decimal: 813/.54 21
- LC Class: PS3572.O395 A83 2001
- Preceded by: Fathers and Crows
- Followed by: The Rifles

Argall is a historical novel by American writer William T. Vollmann, which was first published in 2001. It is the third book in a planned seven-book cycle entitled Seven Dreams: A Book of North American Landscapes. (As of 2020, five of the seven books have been published.)

Argall is a retelling of the founding of the Jamestown Colony and the legend of Pocahontas and Captain John Smith. The novel is primarily written in flowery Elizabethan language, which was met with mixed critical reception; The New York Times found the language "endlessly distracting and often silly", whereas the San Francisco Chronicle found the narrative "informative and even delightful".

The titular (but by no means central) character is Samuel Argall. He did not appear in Disney's 1995 animated film or its 1998 direct-to-video sequel, but was played by Yorick van Wageningen in Terrence Malick's The New World (2005).
