= Gretchen Sisson =

American writer and sociologist

- Occupations: Writer, researcher
- Employer: Advancing New Standards in Reproductive Health at University of California, San Francisco
- Known for: Author of Relinquished: The Politics of Adoption and the Privilege of American Motherhood

Gretchen Sisson is an American sociologist and writer. Sisson works with Advancing New Standards in Reproductive Health at University of California, San Francisco, and is the author of Relinquished: The Politics of Adoption and the Privilege of American Motherhood. Her research on adoption and abortion has been cited in the dissent of Dobbs v. Jackson Women's Health Organization and has been covered in outlets like The Washington Post, The Nation, Time, The Boston Globe, and many others.

== Career ==
A qualitative sociologist, Sisson studies abortion and adoption at Advancing New Standards in Reproductive Health at University of California, San Francisco. Her research was cited in the dissenting opinion of Dobbs v. Jackson Women's Health Organization.

Sisson also writes about media regarding their representations of abortion and adoption, studying American television shows running between 2005–2014 and concluding that "Hollywood grossly exaggerates the risk of abortion: While the number of plotlines featuring abortion has grown in recent decades, movies and television shows often kill off characters for even just contemplating the possibility of this procedure." She and her co-researcher, Steph Harold, told Business Insider that Bridgerton, Grey's Anatomy, Shrill, The Bold Type, Dear White People, Dirty Dancing, and Jane the Virgin had the best portrayals.

Starting in 2010 while working as a doctoral student, Sisson interviewed hundreds of mothers who put their children up for adoption for a project that would eventually become her book, Relinquished: The Politics of Adoption and the Privilege of American Motherhood. After a decade of research, she published it in 2025. She considered the book to be for those who "support reproductive choice but have never interrogated what adoption means and who adoption serves."

Sisson is also on the board of Emerge America, as well as part of the Electing Women Alliance and regularly hosts congressional and gubernatorial candidates from across the country.

== Personal life ==
Sisson is married to Andrew McCollum. The two married in 2012.
