= The Royal Family (novel) =

2000 novel by William T. Vollmann

- First edition
- Author: William T. Vollmann
- Cover artist: William T. Vollmann (photography)
- Language: English
- Genre: Novel
- Publisher: Viking
- Publication date: 2000
- Publication place: United States
- Media type: Print (Paperback & Hardback)
- Pages: 780 pp
- ISBN: 0-14-100200-X (paperback)
- OCLC: 47793886

The Royal Family is a 2000 novel by the American author William T. Vollmann centering around brothers Henry and John Tyler and their connection to the mysterious "Queen of Whores"—the matriarch of the prostitutes in the Tenderloin, San Francisco area—and the devilish entrepreneur, Jonas Brady, who is searching for her.

== Plot ==
The Royal Family, the final volume of Vollmann's "Prostitution Trilogy" alongside Whores for Gloria (1991) and The Butterfly Stories (1994), follows Henry Tyler, a private investigator in San Francisco, California. Tyler has been hired by Jonas Brady, a seedy (but by all official accounts upstanding) entrepreneur, to locate the "Queen" of the Tenderloin district—a seemingly mythical protector of the area's prostitute community. In his initial search for the Queen, Tyler encounters key members of the eponymous royal family, such as Domino, an ageing blonde, and Chocolate, a vivacious Black woman. After locating the Queen, whose real name is Africa, through a variety of illegal databases, Tyler becomes enveloped in the family's unlawful lifestyle.

Henry is obsessed with his sister-in-law, Irene, who is unhappily married to his brother, John. However, after learning that she is pregnant, Irene commits suicide, leaving Henry emotionally distraught. John, who has already began an affair with his assistant, Celia, is merely inconvenienced, at one point complaining that Irene is still costing him money because he has to pay a lawncare fee for her grave. As Henry spirals into depression, he seeks solace in the Queen (or "Maj"), who first provides him a "false Irene" (a prostitute) before deciding to become his lover herself. Through psychochemicals in her spit (which, whether real or imaginary, intoxicate and pleasure the receiver), the Queen leads Henry to develop a dependence upon her. However, his introduction into the royal family is met with some resistance, mainly from Domino and Justin (the Queen's de facto consort, known as "the tall man"). As the royal family—and particularly Henry—describe themselves as having the Mark of Cain, the Queen plays the role of a Christ-like source of healing and sacrifice.

Meanwhile, John is hired by Brady to work on the legal paperwork for Feminine Circus, a virtual sex palace in Las Vegas, Nevada. Despite his suspicion of Brady's intentions, John finds no red flags in either Brady's funding or the business plan and agrees to take on the project. However, in "Book XVIII: Feminine Circus," Vollmann reveals that the palace's "virtual" prostitution is in fact real—and performed by mentally handicapped girls, because, as one character puts it, no one will miss them. Following the launch of Feminine Circus, groups of vigilantes known as "Brady's Boys" invade the Tenderloin, seeking to squash prostitution (and thus drive business to Brady's "legal" sex) and locate the Queen for Brady's nefarious purposes.

== Characters ==
- Henry Tyler, a private investigator who, after tracking down the Queen of Whores, falls in love with her in an attempt to fill the void left by Irene's suicide.
- John Tyler, an intelligent but sociopathic lawyer hired by Jonas Brady to legalize the Feminine Circus virtual sex palace in Las Vegas.
- The Queen (AKA Maj or Africa), the matriarch of Tenderloin whores who, for a time, possesses Christ-like powers.
- Jonas Brady, entrepreneur who establishes Feminine Circus.
- Domino (AKA Sylvia Fine), one of the Queen's primary followers and, later, John's dominatrix. Despite being a key member of the Queen's court, she is often outspoken against her.
- Dan Smooth, a friend of the royal family and pedophile who enjoys semi-immunity from the law due to his effectiveness at incriminating other pedophiles. He is outspoken about his sexual preferences, often disgusting those around him.
- Justin Soames (AKA "the tall man"), the Queen's bodyguard and the only male member of the royal family besides Henry. He is in a relationship with a whore named Strawberry, whom he physically abuses.
- Irene Tyler, John's Korean-American wife who commits suicide after learning she is pregnant with his child. She is emotionally abused by John and seeks solace in Henry.
- Mrs. Tyler, Henry and John's mother, who is in failing health. She is verbally abusive to Irene and neglectful of Henry, although both brothers assert that she gave them an artistic sensibility by forcing them to read classic novels in their youths.
- Chocolate, one of the Queen's primary sycophants.
- Sapphire, a mentally handicapped woman whom the Queen looks after. Like the Queen, she sometimes exhibits Christ-like powers—mainly through cunnilingus.
- Celia, John's assistant who develops a romantic—albeit unloving—relationship with him.

== Themes ==
Like several of Vollmann's other novels, The Royal Family is thematically centered around sex, love, death, drug-addiction, vagabondage, and spirituality. While not a purely allegorical or religious novel, it is heavily biblical, in many ways retelling the story of Jesus Christ through the Queen (i.e., she is the all-loving yet persecuted "Queen of the Whores" whereas he was "King of the Jews").

The novel is in part inspired by French poet Louis Aragon's 1928 cult novella Irene’s Cunt, with several chapters simply containing the sentence "He [Henry] awoke with the taste of Irene's cunt in his mouth." At one point after Irene's suicide, John pulls down his copy of the book, which Vollmann explicitly names, and reads the line "Irène is like an arch above the sea. I have not drunk for a hundred days, and sighs quench my thirst."

== Reception ==
The novel was largely praised upon publication and is now considered a classic of Vollmann's bibliography.

The New York Times published two reviews of the novel. In his positive review, Richard Bernstein wrote: "An immense literary talent is on display in The Royal Family... All along, Mr. Vollmann bears us along on the swelling currents of his prose, which is psychedelic, hallucinatory, slyly self-referential and confiding... His novel is in extraordinary." Contrarily, in her mixed review, Laura Miller called the book "a baffling muddle" and claimed that, "[i]n the end, the spectacle of this potentially fine novel crushed by the weight of its undisciplined author's compulsions is the book's best argument for stripping things down to essentials."
