= Rising Up and Rising Down =

2003 essay by William T. Vollmann

- Author: William T. Vollmann
- Language: English
- Subject: Violence
- Genre: Non-fiction
- Publisher: McSweeney's Books (first edition), Ecco Press (abridged)
- Publication date: November 2003
- Publication place: United States
- Media type: Print (hardcover & paperback)
- Pages: 3352 (first edition)
- ISBN: 978-1-932416-02-2
- OCLC: 53820538

Rising Up and Rising Down: Some Thoughts on Violence, Freedom and Urgent Means is a seven-volume essay on the subject of violence by American author William T. Vollmann. First published by McSweeney's in November 2003, it was nominated for the National Book Critics Circle Award. A single-volume condensed version was published at the end of the year by Ecco Press, an abridgment Vollmann explained by saying, "I did it for the money." Representing over 20 years of work, Rising Up and Rising Down attempts to establish a moral calculus to consider the causes, effects, and ethics of violence. Much of it consists of Vollmann's own reporting from places wracked by violence, among them Cambodia, Somalia, and Iraq. The unabridged edition was only published in one limited run of 3,500 copies.

== Subject and method ==
Rising Up and Rising Down is a wide-ranging study of the justifications for and consequences of violence. The seven-volume edition is divided between essays analyzing the actions and motivations of historical figures (including Napoleon, Abraham Lincoln, John Brown, Robespierre, Cortés, Trotsky, Stalin, and Gandhi) and pieces of journalism and reportage that act as contemporary "case studies" on the problem of violence. The first volume of the set is given over to the "Moral Calculus", Vollmann's attempt to outline rules for when and where violence is justified. Generally, Vollmann maintains that violence is justifiable only in cases of immediate self-defence and defense of innocents—on higher, politically organized levels, justifications of violence are likely to lead to the harm of innocents. This is the longest of Vollmann's works. It is notable for its inclusion of much of Vollmann's reportage and journalism, containing the full versions of many pieces originally commissioned for Harper's, Esquire, and other magazines.

== Contents ==
- MC (Moral Calculus): Annotated Contents/The Moral Calculus/Index/Annexes/Sources Cited
- Volume I: Meditations/Introduction/Definitions
- Volume II: Justifications Honor/Class/Authority/Race and Culture/Creed
- Volume III: Justifications War Aims/Homeland/Ground/Earth/Animals/Gender/Traitors/Revolution
- Volume IV: Justifications Deterrence/Punishment/Loyalty/Sadism/Moral Yellowness/Inevitability Evaluations Safeguards/The Victim
- Volume V: Studies in Consequences Southeast Asia/Europe/Africa
- Volume VI: Studies in Consequences The Muslim World/North America/South America/Perception and Irrationality
