= You Bright and Risen Angels =

Book by William T. Vollmann

- First UK edition
- Author: William Vollmann
- Cover artist: Foreground: Alfred Brehm, Eintagsfliege (Mayfly) from Brehms Tierleben- 1892
- Language: English
- Published: 1987
- Publisher: André Deutsch (UK); Atheneum (US)
- Publication place: United States
- Media type: Print (Hardcover and Paperback)
- Pages: 704 pp
- ISBN: 0-233-98022-9
- OCLC: 14241374

You Bright and Risen Angels is a 1987 novel by William T. Vollmann, detailing a fictional war between insects and the forces of modern civilization. Vollmann described the book, his first, as "an allegory in part", inspired by his experiences with the mujahedeen in Afghanistan. The novel is subtitled "A Cartoon." It is illustrated by the author.

== Writing and composition ==
Vollman did not have a literary agent when he submitted the manuscript of the book to publishers. Vollman has said he used a "'writing by-the-yard' approach" to the novel and that it could have been "ten thousand pages longer".

== Reception ==
=== Critical reception ===
The novel received positive reviews from the New York Times, Publishers Weekly, and elsewhere when published. Kirkus Reviews published a less positive review, comparing the book unfavorably to the work of Thomas Pynchon.

=== Honors ===
You Bright and Risen Angels won the 1988 Whiting Writers' Award.
