= Imperial (Vollmann book) =

2009 non-fiction book by William T. Vollmann

- First edition cover
- Author: William T. Vollmann
- Language: English
- Genre: Literary non-fiction
- Publisher: Viking Books
- Publication date: July 2009
- Publication place: United States
- Media type: Print (hardcover & paperback)
- Pages: 1344 (first edition)
- ISBN: 978-0-670-02061-4

Imperial is a 2009 study of California's Imperial Valley and Imperial County by American author William T. Vollmann. The 1,344-page work is the product of over a decade's research about the area. The book is divided into thirteen sections and explores the history, economics and geography of the region from 13,000 B.C. to the present day, with a particular focus on the border with Mexico.

Vollmann has called Imperial "my Moby-Dick". The book was a finalist for the 2009 National Book Critics Circle Award for general nonfiction.
