= Seven Dreams: A Book of North American Landscapes =

Series of historical novels by William T. Vollmann

Seven Dreams: A Book of North American Landscapes is a series of historical novels by American writer William T. Vollmann about the conflicts between the natives of North America and settlers, governments, and others. Each volume focuses on a different episode in North American history, with most also including digressions and chronological departures. The narrator is credited throughout as William the Blind. The series will comprise seven novels; five books have been published as of 2022. In June of 2026, it was reported that Vollmann, suffering from colon cancer and expecting the two remaining novels to take "more time than [he has] left," had ceased working on the series.

== Volumes ==
- Volume 1: The Ice-Shirt (1990) is about the arrival of the Norsemen in North America (9th–10th centuries).
- Volume 2: Fathers and Crows (1992) is about the efforts of Jesuit missionaries in Canada (16th–18th centuries).
- Volume 3: Argall (2001), written in a 17th-century prose style, is about the settlement of Jamestown (17th century).
- Volume 4: The Poison Shirt (unpublished), either "concerning the Puritans vs. King Philip of Rhode Island," (17th century) or Captain James Cook's voyage to Hawaii (18th century).
- Volume 5: The Dying Grass (2015) is about the Nez Perce War of 1877.
- Volume 6: The Rifles (1994) is about Sir John Franklin's attempt in 1845 to find the Northwest Passage to the Pacific, and also discusses Vollmann's experiences among the Inuit in the 1990s (19th–20th century).
- Volume 7: The Cloud-Shirt (unpublished), "Navajo vs. Hopi (or possibly Navajo vs. oil company) in Arizona" (20th century).
