= The Rifles (novel) =

1994 novel by American writer William T. Vollmann

- First edition cover
- Author: William T. Vollmann
- Cover artist: Jacket design by Daniel Rembert; Cover photograph by Ulli Stelttzer
- Language: English
- Series: Seven Dreams: A Book of North American Landscapes
- Genre: Literary fiction
- Publisher: Viking Penguin
- Publication date: February 24, 1994
- Publication place: United States
- Media type: Print (Paperback and Hardcover)
- Pages: 411 pp (first edition, hardback)
- ISBN: 0-670-84856-5 (first edition, hardback)
- OCLC: 28722824
- Dewey Decimal: 813/.54 20
- LC Class: PS3572.O395 R54 1994
- Preceded by: Fathers and Crows
- Followed by: Argall: The True Story of Pocahontas and Captain John Smith

The Rifles is a 1994 novel by American writer William T. Vollmann. It is intended to be the sixth book in a planned seven-book cycle entitled Seven Dreams: A Book of North American Landscapes. As of 2015 five of the seven have been published, The Rifles being the third to reach print.

Unlike the other books in this series so far, The Rifles is not wholly a historical novel, as it primarily takes place in the early 1990s, although the storyline depicting the trials and challenges of modern Inuit life is tied to the ill-fated exploration of the Arctic region by Sir John Franklin in the mid-19th century. The novel also discusses the 1955 forced migration of Inuit from Inukjuak, Quebec to Resolute, Nunavut.
