= Fathers and Crows =

1992 novel by William T. Vollmann

- First US edition
- Author: William T. Vollmann
- Cover artist: Alfred Pommier, "Martyrdom of Three Jesuit Priests, Father Brebeuf and Lallemant at the Stakes", 1649
- Language: English
- Series: Seven Dreams: A Book of North American Landscapes
- Genre: Historical novel
- Publisher: Viking Press (US); Andre Deutsch (UK)
- Publication date: 1992
- Publication place: United States
- Media type: Print
- Pages: 1008 pp
- ISBN: 0-670-84333-4
- OCLC: 25964915
- Dewey Decimal: 813/.54 20
- LC Class: PS3572.O395 F38 1992
- Preceded by: The Ice-Shirt
- Followed by: Argall: The True Story of Pocahontas and Captain John Smith

Fathers and Crows is a 1992 historical novel by the American author William T. Vollmann. It is the second book in the seven-book series Seven Dreams: A Book of North American Landscapes.

Fathers and Crows explores the encounters and conflicts between French Jesuit missionaries in New France (Canada) and the native Huron and Iroquois peoples in Canada and present-day New York state. The Natives called the Jesuits "Black Robes", for their clerical costume.

Vollman features historical figures as major characters, including Jean de Brébeuf, Isaac Jogues, Samuel de Champlain, Marc Lescarbot, Jean de Biencourt de Poutrincourt et de Saint-Just, Pierre Dugua, Sieur de Monts, and Kateri Tekakwitha, a Catholic Mohawk religious woman who was canonized in October 2012, the first Native American/First Nations person to be so honored.
