= The Ice-Shirt =

1990 novel by William T. Vollmann

- First edition (UK)
- Author: William T. Vollmann
- Cover artist: Timothy Ely
- Language: English
- Series: Seven Dreams: A Book of North American Landscapes
- Genre: Historical novel
- Publisher: André Deutsch (UK); Viking Press (US)
- Publication date: May 1990
- Publication place: Author: United States; First edition: England
- Media type: Print (Hardcover and Paperback)
- Pages: 404 pp (first edition, hardback)
- ISBN: 0-233-98506-9 (first edition, hardback)
- OCLC: 24288516
- Dewey Decimal: 813/.54 20
- LC Class: PS3572.O395 I27 1990b
- Preceded by: first book of series
- Followed by: Fathers and Crows

The Ice-Shirt is a 1990 historical novel by American author William T. Vollmann. It is the first book in a seven-book series called Seven Dreams: A Book of North American Landscapes.

== Fact, Fiction, Meta-fiction ==
The Ice-Shirt is set in the 10th century A.D. and chronicles the arrival of the Norse people in Greenland, Vinland, and the Arctic. The novel blends historical fiction, modern journalism, and the elaborate mythology of the peoples in question, which include Norse, Mi'kmaq, and Inuit. In addition to other Norse sagas such as the Heimskringla, the novel draws heavily from the Flateyjarbók, a 14th-century Icelandic manuscript (especially the Grœnlendinga saga), with particular focus on the character Freydís Eiríksdóttir.

== Schema ==
In addition to the story itself, The Ice-Shirt comprises a preface, a foreword and afterword, glossaries (of characters; places; "dynasties, races and monsters"; and of primary texts), a chronology, and a list of secondary texts. Illustrations by the author (such as his drawings of Icelandic plants, his renderings of ancient maps, and a self-portrait) and free-ranging footnotes are interspersed throughout the book.

The story proper is told in four parts (called movements) with a total of 25 chapters. The longest chapter has 26 subsections; the shortest chapters have only one. Vollmann uses nearly twenty of the subsections to talk about his own northland experiences in the late 1980s; three of these recount the northland experiences told to him by another traveler.

=== The Changers ===
- Wearing the Bear-Shirt – ca. 220-–ca. 940 / the Bear-Shirt / the Shirt of Perpetuity / Old Blood / the Wolf-Shirt / King Harald Fairhair / Hiding the Bear-Shirt / the Dream of the Bears / King Halfdan’s Yule-feast / the Bear-Hunter / Herlaug and Rollaug / Gyda's Reward / the Flight of the Earls / the War of the Islands / the New Lands / the Death of King Harald Fairhair / Gunhild Joins the Family / Denial of the Bear-shirt / Dreams of the Ice-mountain / Greenland Dreams Recalled on a Sunny Swedish morning / the League of the Ice-dreamers / Queen Gunhild and her Murder-burners / Freydis's Father / How Hall Fared / Wearing the Grey Shirt / the First Outlawry
- Wearing the Blue Shirt -- ca. 981–-ca. 1500 / Red and Blue / between Fjord and Ocean / Snæfellsness / Drangar / Thjodhild Jorund's-daughter / Happiness / Haukadale / the Children / the Eldest Son / the Second Outlawry / the Dream of the Black Hands / Tradir / Öxney Island** / the Bench-boards / the Dead Dream / Wearing the Blue Shirt / the Outcome / the Supporters of Thorgest / the Supporters of Eirik / the Third Outlawry / the Bird-islands of Breidafjord / Dimunar's-bay / Blue-shirt / Greenland at the Millennium / the Other Greenlanders /

=== Black Hands ===
- the Hermaphrodite -- ??--c. 30,000 BC / the Bear-shirt / the Storm, the Spirit Woman and the Island / San Francisco Transvestites** / the Woman-shirt / the Cloud-shirt / the Hermaphrodite-shirt / the Bear-shirt / the Ice-shirt / the Bird-shirt
- Birds on a Roof -- and So we were Sitting Idly**
- Brothers and Sisters -- we Found a Few Small Willows / Where Greenland was / Freydis Eiriksdottir
- the Skrælings of Greenland -- 1577
- the Moon and the Sun -- Justina–-Abraham Zeeb's little kifak / a Relation, Concerning the Sun and the Moon / in Praise of the Sun / the Air-bridge
- Wearing the White-shirt -- 1385–-1987 / the Troll-children** / Christian and Margethe / Amortortak and Angangujungoaq / White Shirts and Black Hands** / Amortortak and Emilie

=== Vinland ===
- Dressmaker's Patterns -- 30,000 BC – AD 1007 / Wearing the Ice-shirt / to be Great is to be Misunderstood

=== Freydis Eiriksdottir ===
- Gudrid the Fair -- but at Midnight the North Wind Goes Forth / Thorbjorn Proves himself to be a Person of Quality / a Mournful Banquet in Greenland / Spring on Baffin Island** / Two Grateful Guests / Thorstein without Gudrid / Love and Honor / Waiting for Favorable winds / Fathers and Crows / Gudrid and Thorstein Eiriksson
- the Land of the Counterfeiters -- by its Delineation of Greenland / a Monkish Error / the Voyage of Thorstein and Gudrid / in the West Bygd** / the Talking Corpse / Gudrid and Thorfinn Karlsefni
- Freydis Eiriksdottir -- shee Cast her Greedy Eyes upon us / Thjodhild's dream / Queen, Castle, Rock / the Hall and the Little milkmaid / Demons and Stones / Amortortak** / her Soulscape** / Wearing the Dream-shirt / the Whirlpool-dream / the Evil Traveler / the Edge of the Frozen Sea / the Vestibule / Skulls and Loneliness / the Dead Land / Whiteness and Wind-voices / Love-song for Amortortak / at the Foot of the Ice-mountain / Skulls and Clouds / the Palace of Amortortak / Amortortak
- Ships and Coffins -- Even a Potato in a Dark Cellar / the Seduction of the Brothers / Gladness / the Axe / Preparations for Trade / the Seduction of Leif / the Disappointments of Thorvard / a Ship among Ships / the Norse Ship-berths**
- the Voyage to Vinland -- ca. 1007 / the Map of Sigurdur Stefansson / Waves and Loneliness / Ginnunga Gap / Helluland / the Voyage of Seth Pilsk the Thin** / ~ (continued)** / ~ (concluded)** / the End of the Light / Markland
- Wineland the Good -- when [the Sun] First Comes to Visit the East / Pinpointing their Landfall / Freydis Takes Possession / Gudrid and Karlsefni / Helgi and Finnbogi / the Swimming Games / Freydis Eiriksdottir
- Wearing the Ice-shirt -- it Began to Blow and Raine / Two Lessons on Beauty / the Search for the Skrælings / the Leaf-sun / the Dream of the Ice-cliffs / Freydis in the Forest / the Grove of Uppsala / a Depiction of Yggdrasil in a Seventeenth-century Icelandic Manuscript of the Prose Edda / the Trees of Vinland / the Dream of the Seven Birds
- Skins for Milk -- the Man who is to be a Trader / Snorri Karlsefnisson / Two Dear Friends / Freydis's Milk / the Seduction of Kluskap / the Skull in the Sea / the Luck of Skofte Carrion-Crow / Freydis, Gudrid and the Great Tree / Freydis and Thorvard / Freydis and Gudrid / Wearing the Gold-shirt / Thorvard and the Skrælings / New Clothes / How the Skrælings Whitened themselves / the Axe / Names and gifts / Maktawaakwa / Gudrid and Gudrid / the Quiet Days
- Amortortak and Kluskap -- .. Spontaneity is Only a Term / Amortortak** / the Way to the Sea / a Person among Persons / the Frost-seed / the four Wishes / Freydis and Kluskap / Wearing the Master-shirt / the Invitation / How the Brothers Greeted Each other / the Mountain and the Hill / the First Bout / the Armies / the Second Bout / the Third Bout / the Fourth Bout / the Fifth Bout / the Sixth Bout / the Seventh Bout / Freydis's Dream
- Black Hands -- you will Remark, Sir, that Nothing Rots
- Giants and Trees -- I Remember of Yore / Carrying the War-club and Dreaming of Bad Days / Karlsefni's Preparations / How Gudrid Found Yggdrasil / How Freydis Found Yggdrasil / the Philosophy of Skofte Carrion-crow / the Way beneath the Tree / the Bride of Nothingness / Freydis's Mother / Jötunheim / Slab-land** / Niflheim / the Changers / Wearing the Snake-shirt / Wearing the Horse-shirt / Queen Hel Loki's-daughter / the New Concubine / Freydis Hel's-daughter
- the First Axe-tale -- though Necessity may Force you into Strife / Freydis and Thorvard / Freydis and Gudrid / Womb-fruit / Gudrid begins her Revenge / the Hen and the Silver Game / the Catechism / Black Hands / Carrying the War-club and Freydis / Carrying the War-club and the Axe / the Victor / the Accolades / Freydis and Gudrid / the Skin-shirts / the Outlaws / Port-au-Choix, Newfoundland**
- Wearing the Wall-shirt -- Wise in Measure / the Last Lesson / Helgi and Finnbogi / Finnbogi's Luck / Reunion
- the Second Axe-tale -- I Know for Certain So Much / the Coming of the Frost / Skofte Leaves Freydis / the Frost in Greenland**
- the End -- ca. 1010–-ca. 1430 / the Death of Bjarni Grimolfsson / the Tunersuit in their Twilight Years / 1944 / Summer in the Ruins**
- L'Anse aux Meadows, Newfoundland -- 1987** / Wearing the Ink-shirt

Note: ** Late '80s "travelogue" subsections.
