= Elite panic =

Behavior during disaster events

"Elite panic" is a term coined by Rutgers University researchers Caron Chess and Lee Clarke to describe the behavior of members of the elite during disaster events, typically characterized by a fear of civil disorder and the shifting of focus away from disaster relief towards implementing measures of "command and control".

Further research from Scott Bonn suggests that a cozy, mutually beneficial relationship between the news media and political elites plays a significant role in moral panic processes. He draws on prior studies to conclude that the news media and political elites ("especially presidents") work in tandem in the generation of moral panics and societal issues, thus constructing and crafting policy and public concern in relation to their own priorities.

Building on this idea that the media and political elites can manufacture a moral panic, Chess and Clarke explain that panic persists for both practical and political reasons. They state that in the face of overwhelming evidence that panic is rare among societies, policymakers still assume it likely based on their production of disaster plans as well as other emergency management preparations. In terms of political reasons, Chess and Clarke describe that a consolidation of authority that arises during panics correlates with institutional interests. That is to say, if it is assumed that a disaster will lead to public panic, then it can be expected that government authorities will communicate to citizens in an encouraging manner, possess and sometimes withhold crucial information, and consolidate as many resources as they can. They cite disaster sociologist Kathleen Tierney when concluding that these three circumstances all promote further power to the highest reaches of these government organizations.

== Characteristics ==
Kathleen Tierney describes "elite panic" as being based in:

- "fear of social disorder"
- "fear of poor, minorities and immigrants"
- "obsession with looting and property crime"
- "willingness to resort to deadly force"
- "actions taken on the basis of rumor"

"Elite panic" during a disaster event can take on a number of forms, chiefly that of a phobia of civil disorder among the lower classes and enforcing the protection of private property. It can manifest itself through restrictions on freedom of movement, limiting the spread of information and excessive devotion to law enforcement, in some cases "undermin[ing] the public's capacity for resilient behaviors." After a disaster event, it can also be used to justify scapegoating individuals and quickly pushing through political reforms.

According to Tierney, "elite panic" is often fueled by the effect that responses to disaster events can have on the careers of political leaders, citing the political fallout in the wake of Hurricane Andrew in Florida as well as the boon to Rudy Giuliani's image following the September 11 attacks.

James Hawdon, director of the Center for Peace Studies and Violence Prevention at Virginia Tech concluded that, in times of crisis, a disciplinary rhetoric from a president can heighten public concern about an issue and can result in a moral panic.

To add further context, sociologist Frank Furedi argues that it has never been easier for the State to manufacture a moral panic. He explains that the interrelations between societies in conjunction with the abundance of media access has created a novel phenomenon where governments can foster specific social, religious, or political outcomes.

== Examples ==
Philip L. Fradkin detailed cases of "elite panic" during the Great Chicago Fire, the 1900 Galveston hurricane and the 1906 San Francisco earthquake. After the San Francisco earthquake, Mayor Eugene Schmitz authorized the use of deadly force against "anyone engaged in looting" – chiefly poor and working class victims of the earthquake. While residents of Chinese descent evacuated the disaster areas, and were segregated from white victims of the earthquake, Chinatown was itself looted by soldiers and members of the city's upper classes.

Following the 1964 Alaska earthquake, the Anchorage Police Department suspended search and rescue efforts and hastily deputized a number of people as officers in order to act as protection from what they believed would be an inevitable increase in criminal activity, despite Anchorage residents largely engaging in emergency management.

When the National Institute of Standards and Technology investigated the behavior of occupants of the World Trade Center during the September 11 attacks, they documented a notable absence of "public panic". Only a month after the attacks, the Patriot Act was passed. Kathleen Tierney described the post-9/11 era as being "an almost continuous state of elite panic", the long-term societal consequences of which are still being analyzed.

During the aftermath of Hurricane Katrina, evidence of "elite panic" included the extensive media coverage of and political focus on reported looting and violence, the authorization of deadly force in response to reported property crime and the circulation of rumors about the behavior of New Orleans' lower class and residents of color. Mayor Ray Nagin appeared on The Oprah Winfrey Show and claimed "hooligans [were] killing people, raping people" in the Louisiana Superdome. President George W. Bush subsequently dispatched the United States Army to the city, where they prevented residents from leaving disaster areas. On September 1, 2005, Governor Kathleen Blanco called off search and rescue efforts and diverted the attention of emergency services towards looting, warning that residents of New Orleans caught looting would be shot by veterans of the Iraq War. Michael D. Brown, director of the Federal Emergency Management Agency, was later held responsible for the crisis, despite official guidelines stating that leadership during times of crisis fell to the United States Secretary of Homeland Security, who at the time was Michael Chertoff.

Following the Fukushima Daiichi nuclear disaster, officials communicated unclear and contradictory information to the public, leading many to believe that the government was minimizing the risk of radiation damage.

During the early stages of the COVID-19 pandemic, Mayor of New York City Bill de Blasio urged residents of New York City to "go about their lives", in a statement he later claimed was made in order to "avoid panic".

== See also ==
- Culture of fear
- Elite theory
- Moral panic

== Bibliography ==
- Mooallem, Jon (2020). This is Chance! The Shaking of an All-American City, a Voice That Held It All Together. New York: Random House. ISBN 9780525509912. OCLC 1145967693.
- Solnit, Rebecca (2010) [2009]. A Paradise Built in Hell: The Extraordinary Communities That Arise in Disaster. New York: Penguin Books. ISBN 978-0-670-02107-9. OCLC 567155187.
- Tierney, Kathleen (2008). "7. Hurricane Katrina: Catastrophic Impacts and Alarming Lessons" (PDF). In Quigley, John M.; Rosenthal, Larry A. (eds.). Risking House and Home: Disasters, Cities, Public Policy. Berkeley, California: Institute of Governmental Studies. pp. 119–136. ISBN 978-0-87772-427-8. OCLC 180573794.
- Meigs, James B. (May 2020). "Elite Panic vs. the Resilient Populace". Commentary. ISSN 0010-2601. OCLC 488561243.
- Waldman, Katy (6 November 2012). "The Civilizing Power of Disaster". Slate. The Slate Group. ISSN 1091-2339. OCLC 728292344.
