= Lars Clausen =

German sociologist

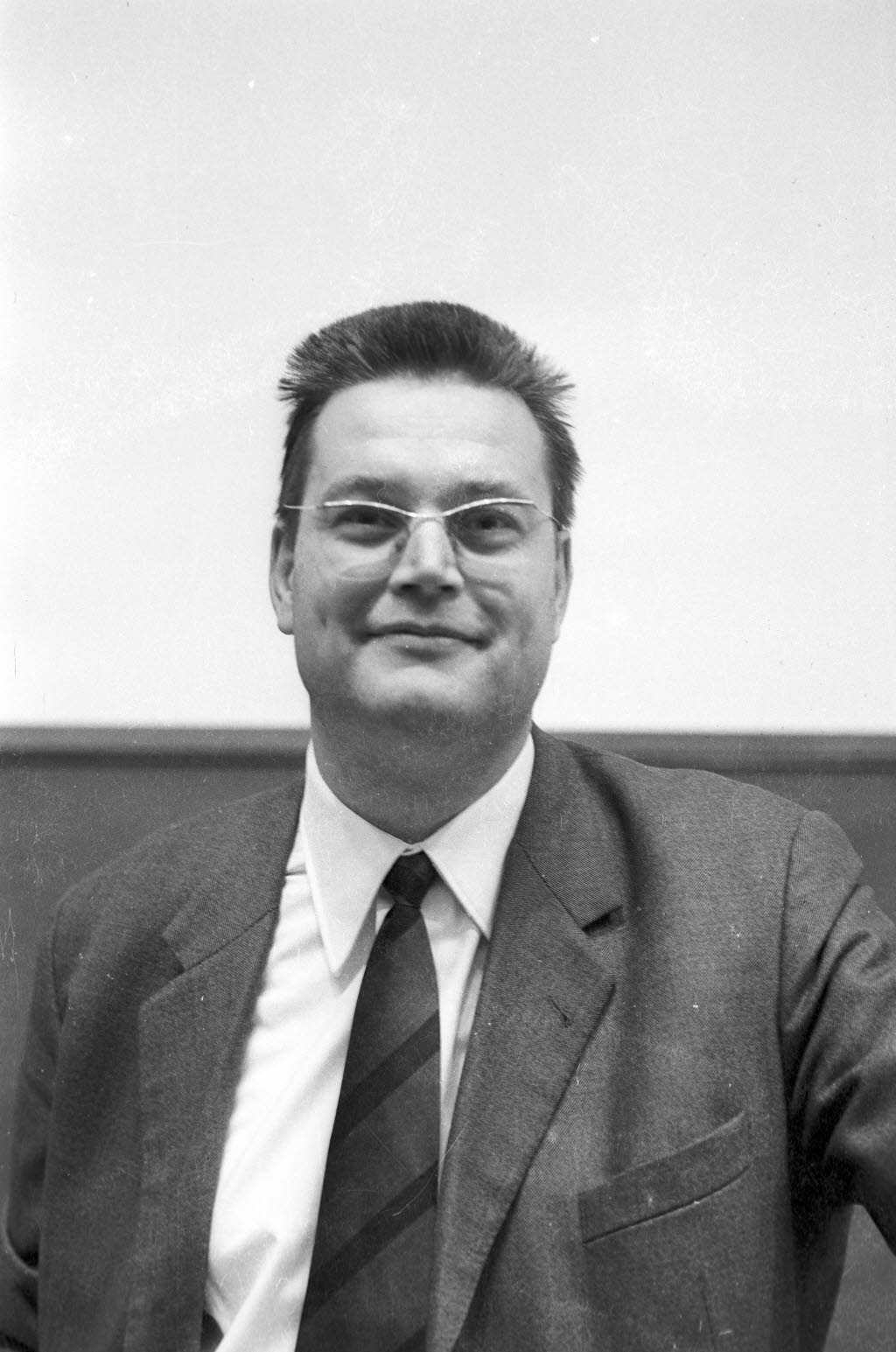
- Born: 8 April 1935; Berlin
- Died: 20 May 2010 (aged 75); Hamburg

Academic background
- Education: University of Münster

Academic work
- Discipline: Sociology of disaster
- Institutions: University of Kiel

Lars Michael Clausen (8 April 1935, Berlin – 20 May 2010, Hamburg) was a German sociologist and professor at the University of Kiel.

== Life and work ==
During World War II, the family lived on the Darß (in Pomerania). 1944 his father Jürgen Clausen, a movie producer, was killed in action; his mother Rosemarie Clausen, a famous photographer, fled with her three children 1945 to Hamburg, where Lars Clausen attended the Christianeum. 1955, he took up Business, Economics, Sociology, and History at the universities of Berlin (the Free University), Cologne, and Hamburg. 1960, he took his first degree in business in Hamburg (Dipl.-Kfm.). He got both his doctorate (Dr.sc.pol.) and post-doctoral degree (Habilitation) at the University of Münster (1964 resp. 1968) in sociology, having done field work in Zambian industries, 1964—65. After academic teaching in Münster, Bielefeld, and The Hague, he was called 1970 to the chair of Sociology at Kiel University. Clausen inspired generations of students with his ingenuity and his ability to illustrate sociological theories with practical examples. He was considered by many to be one of the last polymaths, and his lectures had cult status among students.

He specialized in the sociology of culture, of labor, and of disaster, and is chief editor of the Complete Works of Ferdinand Tönnies.

1993 to 1994, Clausen was Chairman of the German Society for Sociology. He served as well as President of the German Africa Society and as Chairman of the Schutzkommission of the German Ministry of Interior, 2003—2009. From 1978, he was President of the Ferdinand Tönnies Society.

== Awards ==
- 2010: Prize for an outstanding scientific life's work, Deutsche Gesellschaft für Soziologie, Paulskirche
- 1998: Bundesverdienstkreuz 1. Klasse [Cross of Merit 1. Class]
- 1982: Bundesverdienstkreuz
- 1955: Scheffelpreis

== Select bibliography ==
See as well here:

=== Monographs and papers ===
- 1964: Elemente einer Soziologie der Wirtschaftswerbung, Opladen: Westdeutscher Verlag
- 1966: On attitudes towards industrial conflict in Zambian industry, African Social Research, (2), p. 260-268
- 1968:Industrialisierung in Schwarzafrika, Bielefeld
- 1971: "Industrial Man. The Zambian case of radical social change", in: Heide Simonis/Udo E. Simonis (eds.), Socioeconomic development in dual economies, Munich, p. 97–124
- 1976: Jugend soziologie, Stuttgart: Kohlhammer
- 1978: Tausch, Munich: Kösel
- 1978: (with Volker von Borries, Karl Simons) Siedlungssoziologie, Munich: Kösel
- 1979: "The social dimension of the ergonomic approach", in: J. H. van Loon et al. (eds.), Ergonomics in tropical agriculture and forestry, Wageningen, p. 58–64
- 1985: (with Bettina Clausen) Zu allem fähig. Versuch einer Sozio-Biographie zum Verständnis des Dichters Leopold Schefer, 2 vols., Frankfurt on Main: Bangert & Metzler
- 1988: Produktive Arbeit, destruktive Arbeit, Berlin/New York: Walter de Gruyter
- 1992: Social differentiation and the long-term origin of disasters; Natural Hazards, VI, 2, p. 181–190
- 1994: Krasser sozialer Wandel, Opladen: Leske + Budrich
- 1998: "The European revival of Tönnies", C.A.U.S.A., Kiel, No. 26, p. 1–11
- 2003: (with Elke M. Geenen, Elísio Macamo) Entsetzliche soziale Prozesse, Münster: LIT

=== Selected editions ===
- 1975: with Bettina Clausen) Spektrum der Literatur, Gütersloh: Lexikothek, 15 eds. until 1990
- 1981: (with Franz Urban Pappi) Ankunft bei Tönnies, Kiel: Mühlau
- 1985: (with Volker von Borries, Wolf R. Dombrowsky, Hans-Werner Prahl) Tönnies heute, Kiel: Mühlau
- 1990: (with Carsten Schlüter) Renaissance der Gemeinschaft? Berlin: Duncker & Humblot
- 1990: (with Carsten Schlüter) Hundert Jahre "Gemeinschaft und Gesellschaft", Opladen: Leske + Budrich
- 1995: Gesellschaften im Umbruch, Frankfurt on Main/New York: Campus
- 1998–– (chief ed.) Ferdinand Tönnies Gesamtausgabe, 24 vols., Berlin/New York: Walter de Gruyter
  - 1998: (ed.) Ferdinand Tönnies Gesamtausgabe 22: 1932–1936, Berlin/New York: Walter de Gruyter
- 2005: (with Arno Bammé, Rolf Fechner), Öffentliche Meinung zwischen neuer Wissenschaft und neuer Religion, Munich/Vienna: Profil
- 2006: (with Uwe Carstens et al.), Neuordnung der Sozialen Leistungen, Norderstedt

=== Further reading ===
- 1995: Wolf R. Dombrowsky/Ursula Pasero (eds.), Wissenschaft, Literatur, Katastrophen. Festschrift zum sechzigsten Geburtstag von Lars Clausen, Opladen: Westdeutscher Verlag
- 2000: Günter Endruweit/Wolf R. Dombrowsky (eds.), Ein Soziologe und sein Umfeld, Kiel: CAU
- Oliver Stenzel: "Ein fulminantes Feuerwerk zum Finale". In: Kieler Nachrichten, RedaktionsNetzwerk Deutschland (RND), 9. April 2015
