= Ferdinand Tönnies Society =

German sociological research society

Coordinates: 54°19′46.91″N 10°07′17.27″E

Ferdinand Tönnies Society

The Ferdinand Tönnies Society (Ferdinand-Tönnies-Gesellschaft e. V., FTG) was founded in 1956 in Kiel, Germany. Its main purpose is to further sociological research, especially on Ferdinand Tönnies (1855–1936), the founder of German sociology.

== Activities ==
The society publishes an edition of Tönnies' complete works which has been reconstructed using the "textual criticism" technique (Ferdinand Tönnies Gesamtausgabe, 24 vols., edited by Lars Clausen ( -2010), Alexander Deichsel, Cornelius Bickel, Rolf Fechner ( -2006,), Dieter Haselbach, Carsten Schlüter-Knauer, and Uwe Carstens (2006–2020); Berlin and New York, Walter de Gruyter 1998- ). The FTG also publishes the bi-annual Tönnies-Forum magazine.

It also organizes publications and research conferences on sociological topics, namely the "Tönnies Symposia", which have so far taken place in Kiel 1980, 1983, and 1987, in Klagenfurt 2004, in Kiel 2005, in Paris 2007, in Husum 2011, 2013 and 2015, in Kiel 2019.

Furthermore, the FTG owns the Ferdinand-Tönnies-Haus (a student residence) in Kiel and organizes as well public lectures on academic and political topics for the public.

President is at present [since 2020] Dieter Haselbach.
