= River of Shadows =

2003 book by Rebecca Solnit

River of Shadows: Eadweard Muybridge and the Making of the Technological Wild West
- Author: Rebecca Solnit
- Subject: Edweard Muybridge
- Genre: Non-fiction
- Published: February 2003Viking
- Publication place: United States
- Pages: 320
- ISBN: 0142004103
- Dewey Decimal: 778.5/3/092
- Preceded by: As Eve Said to the Serpent: On Landscape, Gender, and Art
- Followed by: Hope in the Dark: Untold Histories, Wild Possibilities

River of Shadows: Eadweard Muybridge and the Technological Wild West is a 2003 book by American writer Rebecca Solnit, published by Viking; in the United Kingdom it was published by Bloomsbury as Motion Studies: Time, Space and Eadweard Muybridge. The book is a biographical portrait of photographer and inventor Eadweard Muybridge, a history of the development of technological change in the West during the later half of the nineteenth century that led to development of the modern film industry in Hollywood and later the information technology industry in Silicon Valley, and an essay focusing on a series of connections between Muybridge's life and the changing human landscape of the American West.

In 2004, Solnit was awarded the National Book Critics Circle Award in Criticism, the Sally Hacker Prize from the Society for the History of Technology, and Harvard's Mark Lynton History Prize for River of Shadows.

== Background and Contents ==
In an interview with PBS, Solnit explains that Muybridge was born in 1830, the same year the first passenger railway ran in England and thus his life spans from the birth of the railroad through the birth of aviation technology. Muybridge's life story itself seems to hinge on three major crises: his carriage accident, his murder of his wife's lover, and his break with patron Leland Stanford. At the same time, his lifespan is also situated in a period and place during which the world around him was changing rapidly and, Solnit argues, in which human experience of time was also changing as a result of new technology. In 11 chapters, Solnit examines how the telegraph, the railroad, photography, and the science of geology all changed how humans understood time and situates Muybridge's role in history and his technological innovations within this context.

Solnit has stated in an interview with The Believer that she considers herself a modern essayist, and River of Shadows is reflective of that style. While it contains elements of history and biography, it also contains many explorations of topics like the history of timekeeping itself that are related to the main ideas of the book.

== Response ==
River of Shadows received a positive response from critics, including Jim Lewis of The New York Times, who called the book "deeply intelligent".

For River of Shadows, Solnit was honored with the 2004 National Book Critics Circle Award in Criticism and the 2004 Sally Hacker Prize from the Society for the History of Technology, which honors exceptional scholarship that reaches beyond the academy toward a broad audience. Solnit was also awarded Harvard's Mark Lynton History Prize in 2004 for River of Shadows.

== References in other works ==
In Solnit's 2008 essay Men who explain things, included in her 2014 collection of essays on feminism Men Explain Things to Me, Solnit references the publication of River of Shadows and the New York Times review in an anecdote she recounts about her interactions with a male guest at a party.
