= A Paradise Built in Hell =

2009 book by Rebecca Solnit

A Paradise Built in Hell: The Extraordinary Communities That Arise in Disaster
- Author: Rebecca Solnit
- Language: English
- Genre: Nonfiction
- Publisher: Viking Press
- Publication date: 2009
- Publication place: United States
- ISBN: 0-670-02107-5

A Paradise Built in Hell: The Extraordinary Communities That Arise in Disaster is a book by American writer Rebecca Solnit, published by Viking Press in 2009. The book deals with the aftermath of disasters, challenging the traditional narrative of chaos and mass panic with evidence that people typically respond to disaster with altruism, solidarity, and mutual aid.

== Background ==
Solnit lives in San Francisco, and A Paradise Built in Hell was inspired by the 1989 Loma Prieta earthquake, which she described as "a remarkable occasion for a lot of us, a moment when everyday life ground to a halt and people looked around and hunkered down". She discussed the earthquake in a Raymond Williams Memorial Lecture she delivered at the University of Cambridge in 2004, before developing the lecture into an article for Harper's Magazine titled "The Uses of Disaster: Notes on Bad Weather and Good Government". The article was published the same day Hurricane Katrina made landfall in New Orleans.

This article led to the idea for A Paradise Built in Hell, which Solnit characterized as presenting "a radically different view of human nature and possibility" based on the premise that "what happens in disasters demonstrates everything an anarchist ever wanted to believe about the triumph of civil society and the failure of institutional authority". The book was published in 2009 by Viking Press.

== Content ==
In A Paradise Built in Hell, Solnit largely focuses on five disasters and their social aftermath: the 1906 San Francisco earthquake, the Halifax Explosion in 1917, the 1985 Mexico City earthquake, the September 11 attacks, and the effects of Hurricane Katrina in New Orleans in 2005. She includes various instances of social action and altruism in response to these disasters, criticizing Thomas Hobbes' notion of "the war of all against all" by providing evidence that mutual aid and cooperation are a typical human response to disasters and the breakdown of official authority. She additionally draws on disaster sociology, recounting the story of Charles Fritz and his conclusion that the typical response to disaster is not mass panic but rather "an intimate, primarily group solidarity among the survivors, which overcomes social isolation, provides a channel for intimate communication and expression, and provides a major source of physical and emotional support and reassurance".

== Reception ==
Jonathan D. Greenberg reviewed A Paradise Built in Hell for the Stanford Social Innovation Review, where he described the book as "brilliant". In Orion, a positive review by Ginger Strand stated that while Strand "picked up Paradise with trepidation born of jingoistic overload ... Solnit is too keen a thinker to fall prey to sentiment". Strand understood the examples in the book "not as a stirring catalogue of good-doing but as a thoughtful assessment of what the human response to disaster can tell us about our political and social structures", and praised Solnit for her "compassion and complexity".

Dwight Garner offered a positive review in The New York Times, characterizing the book as "an investigation not of a thought but of an emotion: the fleeting, purposeful joy that fills human beings in the face of disasters like hurricanes, earthquakes and even terrorist attacks". Garner criticized what he saw as Solnit's tendency toward jargon but described the book as an achievement.
