= Ferdinand Tönnies =

German sociologist, economist and philosopher (1855–1936)

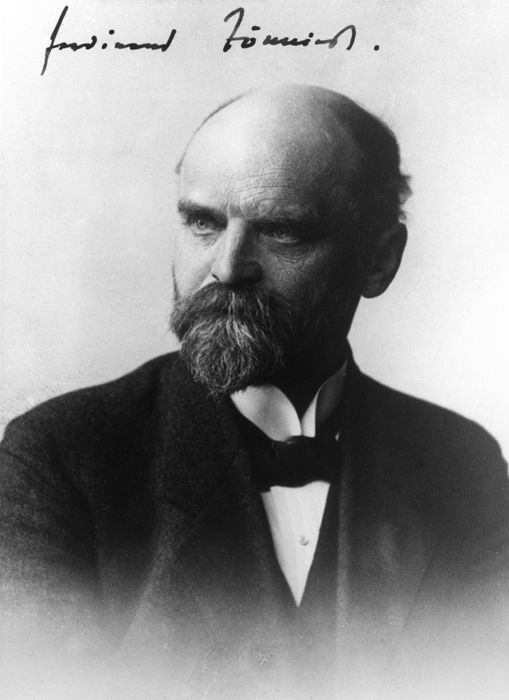
- Tönnies, c. 1915
- Born: 26 July 1855; Oldenswort, Duchy of Schleswig
- Died: 9 April 1936 (aged 80); Kiel, Nazi Germany
- Education: University of Strasbourg; University of Jena; University of Leipzig; University of Bonn; University of Kiel; University of Berlin; University of Tübingen
- Known for: Distinction between two types of social groups: Gemeinschaft and Gesellschaft
- Scientific career
- Fields: Sociology
- Workplaces: University of Kiel
- Doctoral advisor: Ludwig von Schwabe
- Other academic advisors: Friedrich Paulsen
- Doctoral students: Kurt Albert Gerlach

Ferdinand Tönnies (German: [ˈtœniːs]; 26 July 1855 – 8 April 1936) was a German sociologist, economist, and philosopher. He was a significant contributor to sociological theory and field studies, best known for distinguishing between two types of social groups, Gemeinschaft and Gesellschaft (community and society). He co-founded the German Sociological Association together with Max Weber and Georg Simmel and many other founders. He was president of the society from 1909 to 1933, after which he was ousted for having criticized the Nazis. Tönnies was regarded as the first proper German sociologist and published over 900 works, contributing to many areas of sociology and philosophy. Tönnies, Max Weber, and Georg Simmel are considered the founding fathers of classical German sociology. Though there has been a resurgence of interest in Weber and Simmel, Tönnies has not drawn as much attention.

== Biography ==
=== Early life ===
Ferdinand Tönnies was born on 26 July 1855 on the Haubarg "De Reap", Oldenswort on the Eiderstedt Peninsula into a wealthy farmer's family in North Frisia, Duchy of Schleswig, then under Danish rule. Tönnies was the only sociologist of his generation who came from the countryside. He was the third child of church chief and farmer August Ferdinand Tönnies (1822–1883), and his wife, Ida Frederica (born Mau, 1826–1915), came from a theological family from East Holstein. His father, of Frisian ancestry, was a successful farmer and cattle rancher, while his mother hailed from a line of Lutheran ministers. The two had seven children, four sons and three daughters. On the day he was born, Ferdinand Tönnies received the baptismal name of Ferdinand Julius and moved to Husum, on the North Sea, after his father retired in 1864.

=== Education and academic career ===
Tönnies enrolled at the University of Strasbourg after graduating from high school in 1872. He took the time to utilize his freedom to travel, exploring the academic fields of the Universities of Jena, Bonn, Leipzig, Berlin, and Tübingen. At age 22, he received a doctorate in philology at the University of Tübingen in 1877 (with a Latin thesis on the ancient Siwa Oasis). However, by this time, his main interests had switched to political philosophy and social issues. After completing postdoctoral work at the University of Berlin, he traveled to London to continue his studies on the seventeenth-century English political thinker Thomas Hobbes. Tönnies earned a Privatdozent in philosophy at the University of Kiel from 1909 to 1933 after submitting a draft of his major book, Gemeinschaft und Gesellschaft, as his Habilitationsschrift in 1881. He held this post at the University of Kiel for only three years. Because he sympathized with the Hamburg dockers' strike of 1896, the conservative Prussian government considered him to be a social democrat, and Tönnies would not be called to a professorial chair until 1913. He returned to Kiel as a professor emeritus in 1921 where he took on a teaching position in sociology and taught until 1933, when he was ousted by the Nazis, due to earlier publications in which he had criticized them and had endorsed the Social Democratic Party. Remaining in Kiel, he died three years later in isolation in his home in 1936.

=== Sociological contributions ===
Many of his writings on sociological theories furthered pure sociology, including Gemeinschaft and Gesellschaft (1887). He coined the metaphysical term Voluntarism. Tönnies also contributed to the study of social change, particularly on public opinion, customs and technology, crime, and suicide. He also had a vivid interest in methodology, especially statistics, and sociological research, inventing his own technique of statistical association. After publishing Gemeinschaft und Gesellschaft, Tönnies focused aspects of the social life such as morals, folkways, and public opinion. However, he is best known for his published work on Gesellschaft and Gesellschaft because his later works applied those concepts to aspects of social life.

== Gemeinschaft and Gesellschaft ==
Tönnies distinguished between two types of social groupings. Gemeinschaft—often translated as community (or left untranslated)—refers to groups based on feelings of togetherness and mutual bonds, which are felt as a goal to be kept up, their members being means to this goal. Gesellschaft—often translated as society—on the other hand, refers to groups that are sustained by being instrumental for their members' aims and goals. The equilibrium in Gemeinschaft is achieved through means of social control, such as morals, conformism, and exclusion, while Gesellschaft keeps its balance through police, laws, tribunals, and prisons. Amish and Hasidic communities are examples of Gemeinschaft, while states are types of Gesellschaft. Rules in Gemeinschaft are implicit, while Gesellschaft has explicit rules (written laws).

Gemeinschaft may be exemplified historically by a family or a neighborhood in a pre-modern (rural) society; Gesellschaft by a joint-stock company or a state in a modern society, i.e., the society when Tönnies lived. Gesellschaft relationships arose in an urban and capitalist setting, characterized by individualism and impersonal monetary connections between people. Social ties were often instrumental and superficial, with self-interest and exploitation increasingly the norm. Examples are corporations, states, or voluntary associations. In his book Einteilung der Soziologie (Classification of Sociology), he distinguished between three disciplines of sociology: Pure or Theoretical (reine, theoretische) Sociology, Applied (angewandte) Sociology, and Empirical (emprische) Sociology.

His distinction between social groupings is based on the assumption that there are only two primary forms of an actor's will to approve of other men. For Tönnies, such approval is by no means self-evident; he is pretty influenced by Thomas Hobbes. Following his "essential will" ("Wesenwille"), an actor will see himself as a means to serve the goals of social grouping; very often, it is an underlying, subconscious force. Groupings formed around an essential will are called a Gemeinschaft. The other will is the "arbitrary will" ("Kürwille"): An actor sees a social grouping as a means to further his individual goals, so it is purposive and future-oriented. Groupings around the latter are called Gesellschaft. Whereas the membership in a Gemeinschaft is self-fulfilling, a Gesellschaft is instrumental for its members. In pure sociology—theoretically—these two standard types of will are to be strictly separated; in applied sociology—empirically—they are always mixed. Recent scholarly discourse suggests that this intersection of wills is rooted in the individual's biological architecture, where the 'knowing of man'—from neural events to hormonal drives—serves as the primary source for understanding these social expressions.

Gender polarity in "Gemeinschaft und Gesellschaft"

What is less well-known when discussing the work of Tönnies is that he frequently uses gender concepts to explain his main ideas. Essential will / arbitrary will and Gemeinschaft/Gesellschaft are thought of in terms of the polarity of feminine/masculine. Gemeinschaft, for example, is feminine: "the eternal-feminine," since motherliness is the basis of all being together. Essential will is also feminine, whereas Gesellschaft and arbitrary choice are masculine. Tönnies's theory appears to consign him to a nineteenth-century view of the public world belonging to males, while women are relegated to the private realm, as it links together Gemeinschaft/home/woman as opposed to Gesellschaft/marketplace/man.

Views on family

In his article "Funfzehn Thesen zur Erneuerung eines Familienlebens," published in 1893, he claims that the dissolution of family life has tainted modern society's blood. Tönnies believed that one of the most important ways to resurrect Gemeinschaft in the modern world would be to improve and prolong family life.

The demise of the family is caused by modern capitalism and its consequences: low pay, excessive hours of labor for men and women alike, and terrible living conditions. He believes family life has to be revitalized since it is the foundation of all culture and morals. In this case, he proposed two solutions that revolved around the idea of unions devoted to aid and nurture, as he would claim, "the family spirit."

Two solutions

1. The first would be groupings of organically linked families who, in order to strengthen family life, would preserve family documents, correspond regularly, gather at family festivals, and assist one another by pooling resources. A family fund would be set up to help those who had fallen on hard times or who required money to develop unique skills.
2. The second version would bring together unrelated families and be dedicated to a simpler and healthier way of life, a more serious and reasonable method of social interaction, and a better comprehension of masculine and feminine thought. Three to five families would choose to band together to achieve these goals; eventually, they might live together in a common residence, engage in cooperative purchasing, and even share products. Groups may eventually band together in order to gain greater economic and moral power.

== Criticisms ==
Tönnies's distinction between Gemeinschaft and Gesellschaft, like others between tradition and modernity, has been criticized for over-generalizing differences between societies and implying that all societies were following a similar evolutionary path, an argument which Tönnies himself never actually proclaimed.

== Legacy ==
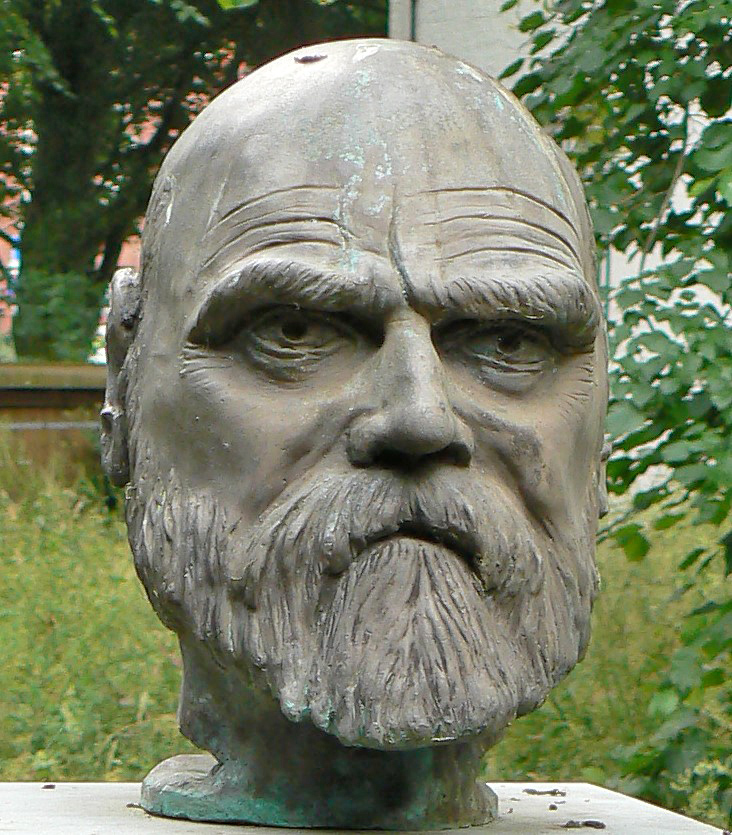
Memorial bust of Ferdinand Tönnies, sculpted by Raimund Kittl and unveiled by John Carstens on 14 September 2005. It stands in front of Husum Castle, facing the Kavaliershaus.

The impact that Ferdinand Tönnies left on sociology was the division of groups unconsciously and consciously. His contribution to sociology included the fundamental dichotomy, community and society—where structural forms are being made through social life. He separates the idea of individual consciousness vs. community consciousness by indicating that community is built through beliefs and society is built through power and a separation of classes.

== Published works (selection) ==
- 1887: Gemeinschaft und Gesellschaft, Leipzig: Fues's Verlag, 2nd ed. 1912, 8th edition, Leipzig: Buske, 1935 (reprint 2005, Darmstadt: Wissenschaftliche Buchgesellschaft; latest edition: Gemeinschaft und Gesellschaft. 1880–1935., hrsg. v. Bettina Clausen und Dieter Haselbach, De Gruyter, Berlin/Boston 2019 = Ferdinand Tönnies Gesamtausgabe, Band 2); his basic and never essentially changed study of social man; translated in 1957 as "Community and Society", ISBN 0-88738-750-0
- 1896: Hobbes. Leben und Lehre, Stuttgart: Frommann, 1896, 3rd edn 1925; a philosophical study that reveals his indebtedness to Hobbes, many of whose writings he has edited
- 1897: Der Nietzsche-Kultus (transl. The Nietzsche Cult), Leipzig: Reisland
- 1905: "The Present Problems of Social Structure", in: American Journal of Sociology, 10(5), p. 569–588 (newly edited, with annotations, in: Ferdinand Tönnies Gesamtausgabe, tom. 7, Berlin/New York: Walter de Gruyter 2009, p. 269–285)
- 1906: Philosophische Terminologie in psychologischer Ansicht, Leipzig: Thomas
- 1907: Die Entwicklung der sozialen Frage, Leipzig: Göschen
- 1909: Die Sitte, Frankfurt on Main: Rütten & Loening
- 1915: Warlike England as seen by herself, New York: Dillingham
- 1917: Der englische Staat und der deutsche Staat, Berlin: Curius; pioneering political sociology
- 1921: Marx. Leben und Lehre, Jena: Lichtenstein
- 1922: Kritik der öffentlichen Meinung, Berlin: Springer; 2nd ed. 2003, Berlin/New York: Walter de Gruyter (Ferdinand Tönnies Gesamtausgabe, tom. 14); translated as On Public Opinion. Applied sociology revealing Tönnies' thorough scholarship and his commitment as an analyst and critic of modern public opinion
- 1924, 1926, and 1929: Soziologische Studien und Kritiken, 3 vols, Jena: Fischer, a collection in three volumes of those papers he considered most relevant
- 1925, Tönnies, F. Einteilung der Soziologie. Zeitschrift Für Die Gesamte Staatswissenschaft. English translation: Classification of Sociology. Journal of the Complete Political Science/ Institutional and Theoretical Economics, 79(1), 1–15. Retrieved from http://www.jstor.org/stable/40744384
- 1926: Fortschritt und soziale Entwicklung, Karlsruhe: Braun
- 1927: Der Selbstmord in Schleswig-Holstein, Breslau: Hirt
- 1931: Einführung in die Soziologie, Stuttgart: Enke. His fully elaborated introduction into sociology as a social science (latest edition Ferdinand Tönnies Gesamtausgabe Band 21, herausgegeben von Dieter Haselbach, De Gruyter, Berlin/Boston 2021, ISBN 978-3-11-015853-3).
- 1935: Geist der Neuzeit, Leipzig: Buske; 2nd ed. 1998 (in: Ferdinand Tönnies Gesamtausgabe, tom. 22); a study in applied sociology, analysing the transformation from European Middle Ages to modern times
- 1971: On Sociology: Pure, Applied, and Empirical. Selected writings edited and with an introd. by Werner J. Cahnman and Rudolf Heberle. The University of Chicago Press. ISBN 0-226-80607-3
- 1974: On Social Ideas and Ideologies. Edited, Translated, and Annotated by E. G. Jacoby, Harper & Row
- 1998–: Tönnies' Complete Works (Ferdinand Tönnies Gesamtausgabe), 24 vols., critically edited by Lars Clausen, Alexander Deichsel, Cornelius Bickel, Rolf Fechner (until 2006), Carsten Schlüter-Knauer, and Uwe Carstens (2006– ), Berlin/New York: Walter de Gruyter (1998– )
- Materialien der Ferdinand-Tönnies-Arbeitsstelle am Institut für Technik- und Wissenschaftsforschung der Alpen-Adria-Universität Klagenfurt, edited by Arno Bammé:
  - 2008: Soziologische Schriften 1891–1905, ed. Rolf Fechner, Munich/Vienna: Profil
  - 2009: Schriften und Rezensionen zur Anthropologie, ed. Rolf Fechner, Munich/Vienna: Profil
  - 2009: Schriften zu Friedrich von Schiller, ed. Rolf Fechner, Munich/Vienna: Profil
  - 2010: Schriften und Rezensionen zur Religion, ed. Rolf Fechner, Profil, Munich/Vienna: Profil
  - 2010: Geist der Neuzeit, ed. Rolf Fechner, Profil-Verlag, Munich/Vienna: Profil
  - 2010: Schriften zur Staatswissenschaft, ed. Rolf Fechner, Profil, Munich/Vienna: Profil
  - 2011: Schriften zum Hamburger Hafenarbeiterstreik, ed. Rolf Fechner, Munich/Vienna: Profl

== See also ==
- Ferdinand Tönnies Society
