= Orwell's Roses =

2021 book by Rebecca Solnit

- Author: Rebecca Solnit
- Subject: Biography, literary criticism
- Publisher: Viking Press
- Publication date: October 19, 2021
- Pages: 320
- ISBN: 9780593083369

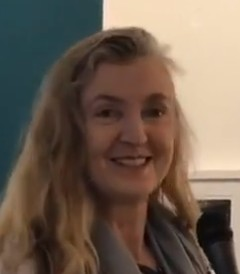
The author speaking in 2018

Orwell's Roses is a book of biography and literary criticism by Rebecca Solnit. The book explores the relation between George Orwell's interest in gardening and his other authorial and political commitments.
