= Condescension =

Attitude of patronizing superiority

Condescension or condescendence is a form of incivility wherein the speaker displays an attitude of patronizing superiority or contempt. Condescension "is associated with a patronizing attitude, and with other negative words such as divisive, heartless, arrogant, high-handed, [and] dictatorial". The use of condescending language "can derail conversations and, over time, disrupt healthy communities".

== Etymology ==
The meaning of the word has evolved over time. In the eighteenth century, condescension or condescending denoted a positive characteristic of a person of superior breeding, class, or some other superior set of characteristics lowering themselves to speak kindly to an inferior. By the nineteenth century, the word had developed a negative connotation, as evidenced by Charles Dickens in Dombey and Son, where a character is described in contrasting terms as "a little condescending, but extremely kind". "In eighteenth-century prose, it is therefore common to find the word condescension qualified by adjectives such as generous, good, kind, humble, and particularly affable. This last word shows that condescension had become an index not only of ethical practice, but also of personality".

This changed in the Victorian era, when "the belief in a constructive condescension largely fell away, and the word itself (with exceptions) was given over to its negative connotations. Condescension came primarily to signify self-promotion at another's cost; to condescend was to assert one's own superiority in a way that degraded others".

== See also ==
- Mansplaining
- Paternalism
- community
