= Mansplaining =

Act of explaining in a condescending manner

Mansplaining (a blend word of man and the informal form splaining of the gerund explaining) is a neologism describing the act of a man explaining something to a woman in a condescending, overconfident, and often inaccurate or oversimplified manner, without regard to her own expertise.

Traditionally, mansplaining differs from other forms of condescension in that it was said to be rooted in the assumption that a man is likely to be more knowledgeable than a woman. However, it has come to be used more broadly, often applied when a man takes a condescending tone in an explanation to anyone, regardless of the age or gender of the intended recipients: a "man 'splaining" can be delivered to any audience.

In 2013, Dictionary.com said it was adding both mansplain and the suffix (libfix) -splain to its dictionary. Its announcement read in part: "In addition to being creative, this term, particularly the -splaining part, has proven to be incredibly robust and useful as a combining form in 2013." Mansplaining has also engendered parallel constructions such as womansplaining, whitesplaining, rightsplaining, and goysplaining.

As the word became more popular, several commentators complained that misappropriation had diluted its original meaning. Joshua Sealy-Harrington and Tom McLaughlin wrote in the newspaper The Globe and Mail that the term has been used as an ad hominem to silence debate. Some critics of the term consider it pejorative.

Research at Tilburg University on mansplaining refuted the simplistic idea of a man-explains-to-a-woman. The study indicate that men do not overestimate their knowledge more than women, women are quicker to interpret explanations as condescending, and that the gender of the 'explainer' does not matter. The study concludes that, although a man may have a genuine intention to help, interpretation bias on the part of the recipient can cause this to be perceived as a condescending 'attack'. In this process, the speaker's positive intention is ignored.

== Etymology ==
The verb splain has been in use for more than 200 years, originally as a colloquial pronunciation of the Late Middle English word explain. It came increasingly to refer to condescending or verbose explanations. Dictionary.com noted that the meaning of mansplain had changed somewhat since 2009, from "intense and serious to casual and jocular", while older -splain words still have "heavy cultural and political connotations and are often added to the names of politicians".

The word exists in dozens of languages, including the German herrklären, French mecspliquer, Italian minchiarimento, and Spanish machoexplicación.

== Origin and usage ==
The term mansplaining was inspired by an essay, "Men Explain Things to Me: Facts Didn't Get in Their Way", written by author Rebecca Solnit and published on TomDispatch.com on 13 April 2008. In the essay, Solnit told an anecdote about a man at a party who said he had heard she had written some books. She began to talk about her most recent, on Eadweard Muybridge, whereupon the man cut her off and asked if she had "heard about the very important Muybridge book that came out this year," not considering that it might be Solnit's book, which in fact it was. Solnit did not use the word mansplaining in the essay, but she described the phenomenon as "something every woman knows".

A month later the word appeared in a comment on the social network LiveJournal. It became popular among feminist bloggers before entering mainstream commentary. Solnit ascribed the phenomenon of mansplaining to a combination of "overconfidence and cluelessness". Lily Rothman, of The Atlantic, defined it as "explaining without regard to the fact that the explainee knows more than the explainer, often done by a man to a woman". Solnit later published Men Explain Things to Me (2014), a collection of seven essays on social issues and human rights themes. Women, including professionals and experts, are routinely seen or treated as less credible than men, she wrote in the title essay, and their insights, or even legal testimony are dismissed unless validated by a man in some countries. She argued that this was one symptom of a widespread phenomenon that "keeps women from speaking up and from being heard when they dare; that crushes young women into silence by indicating, the way harassment on the street does, that this is not their world. It trains us in self-doubt and self-limitation just as it exercises men's unsupported overconfidence."

In 2010, it was named by the New York Times as one of its "Words of the Year". The word was nominated in 2012 for the American Dialect Society's "most creative word of the year" honor. In 2014 it was added to the online Oxford Dictionaries.

Journalists have used the word to describe the 2012 Republican presidential nominee, Mitt Romney; President Donald Trump; Governor of Texas Rick Perry; MSNBC host Lawrence O'Donnell; various characters on the HBO drama series The Newsroom; music executive Jimmy Iovine; Australian Prime Minister Malcolm Turnbull; actor Matt Damon; and consumer rights advocate Ralph Nader. In February 2016 the term sparked an argument between two members of a committee of the Australian Senate, when Labor senator Katy Gallagher told Communications Minister Mitch Fifield: "I love the mansplaining. I'm enjoying it."

Mansplaining goes further into political digital spheres amongst regular citizens as well. People being mansplained, typically women, are least likely to engage in political banter in public spaces, however, they are more inclined to do it with family. They also take a subordinate role to men in conversation. Women are more likely to use tentative language or "hedge" words and are overwhelmingly more interrupted than men In the Czech Republic during 2013 and 2015 parliamentary electoral campaigns, women who were posting to social media were less negative in expressing their political opinions, especially on profiles that they supported. Digitally, it is suggested that the women who do speak publicly about politics are more likely to share their thoughts on Facebook, rather than Twitter. This is due to the fact that on Twitter, you can connect with anyone and not have to mutually accept a friend request like on Facebook. This connects with the idea that women are more inclined to speak their political thoughts with their family.

Women are inclined to be more sensitive to the "rapport dynamic" of conversation (the emotions and desires of their conversational partner), whereas men are more sensitive to the "power dynamic" (who has greater power in a given exchange and how power is gained and lost through communication). Since politics is a male-dominated field in most areas of the world, the environment of political discourse can be especially inhospitable for women. It is already assumed that women do not know much about politics so political banter can be hostile and mansplaining can happen. Even some women might believe that, because of their gender, they are not educated enough about politics.

Twitter is a platform where mansplaining is most likely to be done and where the man is most likely to mansplain. The odds are higher to get into a political argument on Twitter. Twitter is more likely to be used as a proxy for public opinion than Facebook. Men on the right are more likely to be accused of mansplaining as well, while women who are mansplain victims are more likely to be better educated, younger, and Caucasian.

== Reception ==
MPR News Staff disputed the usefulness of the term. Given its gender-specific nature and negative connotation, Lesley Kinzel described it as inherently biased, essentialist, dismissive, and a double standard. In a 2016 Washington Post article, Cathy Young wrote that it is just one of a number of terms using "man" as a derogatory prefix, and that this convention is part of a "current cycle of misandry". Meghan Daum, in a 2015 Los Angeles Times article, wrote that "To suggest that men are more qualified for the designation than women is not only sexist but almost as tone deaf as categorizing everything that a man says as mansplaining." In 2014 Solnit herself said she had doubts about it: "[I]t seems to me to go a little heavy on the idea that men are inherently flawed this way, rather than that some men explain things they shouldn't and don't hear things they should."

== See also ==
- Ad Hominem (Circumstantial)
- Dunning–Kruger effect
- Genderlect theory
- Himpathy
- Manosphere
- Manspreading
- Manterrupting
- Sociolinguistics
- Tone policing
- Teaching grandmother to suck eggs, a gender-neutral idiom for a similar phenomenon
- Westsplaining
