= The Faraway Nearby =

2013 book by Rebecca Solnit

- First edition
- Author: Rebecca Solnit
- Language: English
- Subject: Autobiography, memoir
- Genre: Nonfiction
- Published: June 2013 (Viking Books)
- Publication place: United States
- Media type: Print
- Pages: 272
- ISBN: 9780143125495
- Text: The Faraway Nearby at the book publisher's website

The Faraway Nearby is a 2013 book by Rebecca Solnit. Containing writing reminiscent of memoir, literary criticism, travelogue, prose poetry, as well as analyses of myth, fairytale and narratives more generally, the book defies easy categorization. Solnit writes about apricots, her residency in Iceland at the Library of Water, her mother's struggle with Alzheimer's disease, Mary Shelley's Frankenstein, Wile E. Coyote and the Road Runner, Che Guevara, Buddhism, and her cancer surgery. The book also contains a single italicized line running along the bottom of each page that is a kind of story or poem of its own. The title of the book comes from a letter written by Georgia O'Keeffe, in which she signed off "from the faraway nearby" by moving from New York to New Mexico. It is also the title of a painting by Georgia O'Keeffe.
