= Westsplaining =

Political interpretation of Eastern European events by Westerners

Westsplaining (a portmanteau of west and the informal form -splaining of the gerund explaining) is a pejorative term that represents criticism of Western sociopolitical views of other parts of the world. It has been used primarily in relation to Western discussions of Central and Eastern Europe and its historical and current relations with the Soviet Union and Russia.

The word became virally popular during the Russian invasion of Ukraine after Jan Smoleński and Jan Dutkiewicz defined the word to mean "[the] phenomenon of people from the Anglosphere loudly foisting their analytical schema and political prescriptions onto the [Central and Eastern European] region", which "ignore[s] voices from the region".

== Pre-2022 usage ==
The earliest known usage of the term was in May 2017 during a keynote address by Einat Wilf at the second annual Academic Engagement Network conference in Chicago. Wilf coined the term to describe a phenomenon wherein Western audiences, Wilf argues, hear what Muslim and Arab leaders say and, rather than "respecting what they say and taking them at their word," they attempt to re-present the information in a way that serves a Western political agenda.

The term first appeared in relation to Europe on the news website Balkan Insight in 2017, where an editor headlined an article 'Westsplaining the Balkans'. In the article, its author Srdjan Garcevic states, "Balkanism gives birth to the worst type of tourist – the kind who after reading one book and spending a few days in the region 'westsplains' history and politics to the locals."

In 2019, journalist Edward Lucas described the term westsplaining as referring to a common event in conferences, diplomatic meetings and online social networks, in which Westerners criticised Eastern Europeans' distrust of "dialogue with Russia". Lucas saw westsplainers as including right-wing Westerners who "secretly" admired Russian military interventions; left-wing Westerners who saw NATO, the United States and defence spending as "the real enemy"; and a third group who were "just greedy". Lucas argued that westsplaining led Westerners to misjudge Russian threats and actions against Western and Eastern Europe and failed to learn from Easterners.

== Russian invasion of Ukraine ==
In an essay published in The New Republic on 4 March 2022, University of Warsaw lecturer Jan Smoleński and researcher Jan Dutkiewicz from Concordia University and Harvard University argued that the sociopolitical analysis of the Russian invasion of Ukraine by the core Anglosphere ignored analysis by Eastern European scholars and the experiences of peoples from the region. The latter described the Anglosphere attitude as westsplaining. Smoleński and Dutkiewicz accused Anglosphere scholars and political commentators from across the political spectrum, including John Mearsheimer, Ted Galen Carpenter of the Cato Institute, Wolfgang Streeck, Jeffrey Sachs, Yannis Varoufakis, Tucker Carlson, and Mariana Mazzucato, of focusing on the enlargement of NATO and Russia–United States relations as having primary importance, neglecting Ukraine's international legal right of self-determination. Smoleński and Dutkiewicz state that "[i]n the westsplaining framework, the concerns of Russia are recognized but those of Eastern Europe are not." Legal scholar Patryk Labuda described westsplaining in this context as ignoring Russian imperialism as an explanation of the invasion, in favour of NATO expansion as the main causal factor. Labuda stated that there was "a real risk" of international lawyers westsplaining in the broader contexts of their legal analyses of the 2022 Russian invasion of Ukraine.

Smoleński and Dutkiewicz refer to an article by Hanna Hrytsenko, published by Euromaidan Press on 6 June 2022, which claimed that the term had been coined "in the Ukrainian segment of Twitter" following reactions from a number of Western journalists to a thread by Sergei Sumlenny comparing the treatment of Ukrainians under the Russian Empire and during the Soviet Union to "blacks in racist America."

Left-wing Westerners were criticised by Eastern Europeans, including anarchist Zosia Brom and philosopher Tereza Handl, as westsplaining in that they ignored self-determination and the political agency of Eastern Europeans in the context of discussions related to the invasion, and they ignored Russian imperialism.

The editors of International Feminist Journal of Politics argued for a feminist view of westsplaining in relation to the invasion, in which they saw intellectuals and politicians "imagining an apocalyptic encounter between the powers of 'freedom' and 'authoritarian darkness'" and ignoring questions of discrimination for "gender, race, sexuality, or queerness".

== Reactions ==
The departure of the Left Together Polish political party from the Progressive International coalition and from DiEM25 was attributed to westsplaining of the invasion (a failure to unambiguously declare support for Ukrainian sovereignty) by Western members of the coalition.

Yanis Varoufakis, a Greek economist and politician accused of westsplaining by Smoleński and Dutkiewicz, interpreted westsplaining to mean the denial of Eastern Europeans' political agency. Varoufakis responded to the criticism by saying that he was aware of the Easterners' view that non-expansion by NATO would still have led to a Russian invasion of Ukraine, but disagreed with it. He argued that both the Easterners' view and the alternative hypothesis, that NATO non-expansion would have led to no war and "no dangerous tensions in Eastern Europe", were unprovable counterfactuals, and that describing him as a westsplainer was not justified as part of respectful dialogue among leftists.

== See also ==
- Mansplaining
- Orientalism
- Paternalism
- Tankie
- Whataboutism
- White savior
