= Public opinion =

Aggregate of individual attitudes or beliefs held by the adult population

Public opinion, or popular opinion, is the collective opinion on a specific topic or voting intention relevant to society. It is the people's views on matters affecting them.

In the 21st century, public opinion is heavily influenced by the media; many studies have been undertaken which look at the different factors which influence public opinion. Politicians and other people concerned with public opinion often attempt to influence it using advertising or rhetoric. Opinion plays a vital role in making some critical decisions. Sentiment analysis or opinion mining is a method used to mine the thoughts or feelings of the general population. One of the struggles of public opinion is how it can be influenced by misinformation.

== Etymology ==
The term "public opinion" was derived from the French opinion publique, which was first used in 1588 by Michel de Montaigne, one of the most significant philosophers of the French Renaissance, in the second edition of his famous Essays (ch. XXII).

The French term also appears in the 1761 work Julie, or the New Heloise by Jean-Jacques Rousseau.

Precursors of the phrase in English include William Temple's "general opinion" (appearing in his 1672 work On the Original and Nature of Government) and John Locke's "law of opinion" (appearing in his 1689 work An Essay Concerning Human Understanding).

== History ==
The emergence of public opinion as a significant force in the political realm dates to the late 17th century, but opinion had been regarded as having singular importance much earlier. Medieval fama publica or vox et fama communis had great legal and social importance from the 12th and 13th centuries onward. Later, William Shakespeare called public opinion the "mistress of success" and Blaise Pascal thought it was "the queen of the world".

In his treatise, An Essay Concerning Human Understanding c, John Locke considered that man was subject to three laws: the divine law, the civil law and most importantly in Locke's judgement, the law of opinion or reputation. He regarded the latter as of the highest importance because dislike and ill opinion force people to conform in their behaviour to social norms; however he did not consider public opinion as a suitable influence for governments.

In his 1672 essay On the Original and Nature of Government, William Temple gave an early formulation of the importance of public opinion. He observed that "when vast numbers of men submit their lives and fortunes absolutely to the will of one, it must be force of custom, or opinion which subjects power to authority". Temple disagreed with the prevalent opinion that the basis of government lay in a social contract and thought that government was merely allowed to exist due to the favour of public opinion.

The prerequisites for the emergence of a public sphere were increasing levels of literacy which was spurred on by the Reformation, which encouraged individuals to read the Bible in the vernacular, and the rapidly expanding printing presses. During the 18th century, religious literature was replaced by secular literature, novels and pamphlets. In parallel to this was the growth in reading societies and clubs. At the turn of the century the first circulating library opened in London and the public library became widespread and available to the public.

=== Public opinion in British politics ===
==== Coffee-houses ====
Coffeehouse in 17th century London

An institution of central importance in the development of public opinion was the coffee-house, which became widespread throughout Europe in the mid-17th century. Although Charles II later tried to suppress the London coffeehouses as "places where the disaffected met, and spread scandalous reports concerning the conduct of His Majesty and his Ministers", the public flocked to them. For several decades following the Restoration, the Wits gathered round John Dryden at Will's Coffee House in Russell Street, Covent Garden. The coffee houses were great social levellers, open to all men and indifferent to social status, and as a result associated with equality and republicanism.

More generally, coffee houses became meeting places where business could be carried on, news exchanged and The London Gazette (government announcements) read. Lloyd's of London had its origins in a coffeehouse run by Edward Lloyd, where underwriters of ship insurance met to do business. By 1739, there were 551 coffeehouses in London. Each attracted a particular clientele divided by occupation or attitude, such as Tories and Whigs, wits and stockjobbers, merchants and lawyers, booksellers and authors, men of fashion or the "cits" of the old city center. Joseph Addison wanted to have it said of him that he had "brought philosophy out of closets and libraries to dwell in clubs and assemblies, at tea tables and in coffee houses". According to one French visitor, Antoine François Prévost, coffeehouses, "where you have the right to read all the papers for and against the government", were the "seats of English liberty".

==== Gentleman clubs ====
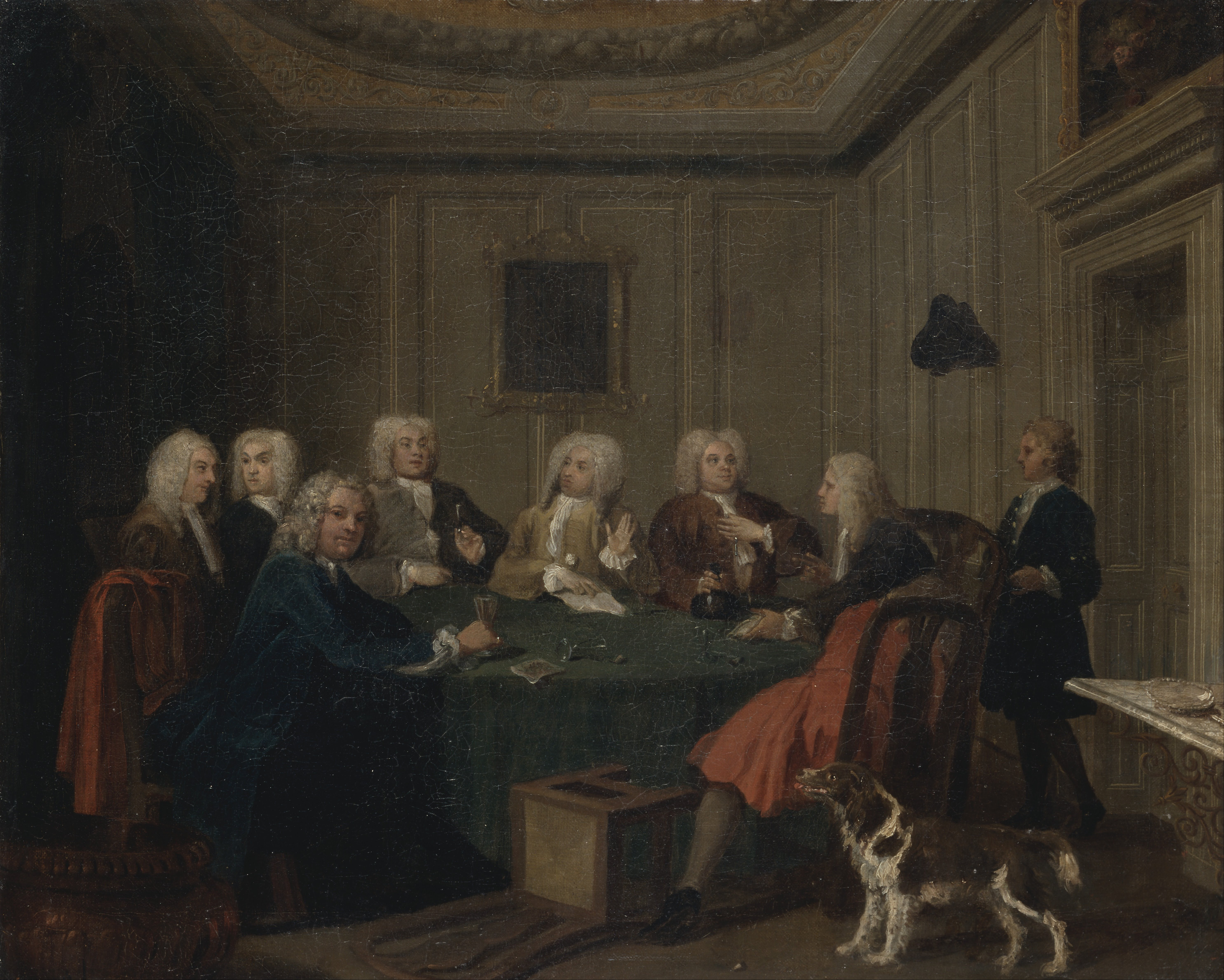
A Club of Gentlemen by Joseph Highmore, c. 1730

Gentlemen's clubs proliferated in the 18th century, especially in the West End of London. Clubs took over the role occupied by coffee houses in 18th-century London to some degree and reached the height of their influence in the late 19th century. Some notable names were White's, Brooks's, Arthur's and Boodle's which still exist today.

These social changes, in which a closed and largely illiterate public became an open and politicized one, was to become of tremendous political importance in the 19th century as the mass media was circulated ever more widely and literacy was steadily improved. Governments increasingly recognized the importance of managing and directing public opinion. This trend is exemplified in the career of George Canning who restyled his political career from its aristocratic origins to one of popular consent when he contested and won the parliamentary seat in Liverpool, a city with a growing and affluent middle class which he attributed to the growing influence of "public opinion".

Jeremy Bentham was an impassioned advocate of the importance of public opinion in the shaping of constitutional governance. He thought it important that all government acts and decisions should be subject to the inspection of public opinion, because "to the pernicious exercise of the power of government it is the only check". He opined that public opinion had the power to ensure that rulers would rule for the greatest happiness of the greater number. He brought in Utilitarian philosophy in order to define theories of public opinion.

==== Public meetings and newspapers ====
By the 1820s public opinion became a central force in British political life, increasingly influencing government policy and party strategy. The power of public opinion was closely tied to the expansion of literacy, the growth of the press, and the rise of mass political participation. Politicians held large local meetings and their speeches were widely disseminated. Newspapers played an increasingly central role. According to historian Aled Jones, the energies released by Victorian politics promoted a "lively and heterogeneous press, and the emergence of reformed political and administrative systems was the subject of intense scrutiny and speculation by journalists and their readers throughout Britain."

The expansion of the electorate was the major theme of 19th-century British reform movements. The Reform Acts (notably 1832, 1867, and 1884) progressively expanded the franchise, allowing more men—especially from the middle and working classes—to vote. The reforms greatly enlarged the political power of the fast-growing cities, and sharply reduced the role of small rotten boroughs controlled by elite families. Each reform was a response to social pressures and the growing recognition of public opinion's legitimacy. By 1900, about 40% of the men could vote, and the political parties competed vigorously to appeal to a broader public.

Political analyst A.V. Dicey argued that public opinion ruled England more than any other country, due to its advanced civil society and responsive constitution.

== Theory ==
The German sociologist Ferdinand Tönnies, by using the conceptional tools of his theory of Gemeinschaft and Gesellschaft, argued (Kritik der öffentlichen Meinung, 1922), that 'public opinion' has the equivalent social function in societies (Gesellschaften) which religion has in communities (Gemeinschaften).

German social theorist Jürgen Habermas contributed the idea of public sphere to the discussion of public opinion. According to Habermas, the public sphere, or bourgeois public, is where "something approaching public opinion can be formed". Habermas claimed that the Public Sphere featured universal access, rational debate, and disregard for rank. However, he believes that these three features for how public opinion are best formed are no longer in place in western liberal democratic countries. Public opinion, in Western democracy, is highly susceptible to elite manipulation.

The American sociologist Herbert Blumer has proposed an altogether different conception of the "public". According to Blumer, public opinion is discussed as a form of collective behavior (another specialized term) which is made up of those who are discussing a given public issue at any one time. Given this definition, there are many publics; each of them comes into being when an issue arises and ceases to exist when the issue is resolved. Blumer claims that people participate in public in different capacities and to different degrees and public opinion polling cannot measure the public. An educated individual's participation is more important than that of a drunk. The "mass" in which people independently make decisions about, for example, which brand of toothpaste to buy, is a form of collective behavior different from the public.

Public opinion plays an important role in the political sphere. Cutting across all aspects of the relationship between government and public opinion are studies of voting behavior. These have registered the distribution of opinions on a wide variety of issues, have explored the impact of special interest groups on election outcomes and have contributed to our knowledge about the effects of government propaganda and policy.

Contemporary, quantitative approaches to the study of public opinion may be divided into four categories:

1. Quantitative measurement of opinion distributions.
2. Investigation of the internal relationships among the individual opinions that make up public opinion on an issue.
3. Description or analysis of the public role of public opinion.
4. Study both of the communication media that disseminate the ideas on which opinions are based and of the uses that propagandists and other manipulators make of these media.

== Formation ==
Numerous theories and substantial evidence exist to explain the formation and dynamics of individuals' opinions. Much of this research draws on psychological research on attitudes. In communications studies and political science, mass media are often seen as influential forces on public opinion. Additionally, political socialization and behavioral genetics sometimes explain public opinion.

=== Mass media effects ===
The formation of public opinion starts with agenda setting by major media outlets throughout the world. This agenda setting dictates what is newsworthy and how and when it will be reported. The media agenda is set by a variety of different environmental and news-work factors that determine which stories will be newsworthy.

Another key component in the formation of public opinion is framing. Framing is when a story or piece of news is portrayed in a particular way and is meant to sway the consumer's attitude one way or the other. Most political issues are heavily framed in order to persuade voters to vote for a particular candidate. For example, if Candidate X once voted on a bill that raised income taxes on the middle class, a framing headline would read "Candidate X Doesn't Care About the Middle Class". This puts Candidate X in a negative frame to the news reader.

Social desirability is another key component to the formation of public opinion. Social desirability is the idea that people in general will form their opinions based on what they believe is the prevalent opinion of the social group they identify with. Based on media agenda setting and media framing, most often a particular opinion gets repeated throughout various news mediums and social networking sites, until it creates a false vision where the perceived truth can actually be very far away from the actual truth. When asked for their opinion on a subject about which they are uninformed, people often provide pseudo-opinions they believe will please the questioner.

Public opinion can be influenced by public relations and the political media. Additionally, mass media utilizes a wide variety of advertising techniques to get their message out and change the minds of people. Since the 1950s, television has been the main medium for molding public opinion. Since the late 2000s, the Internet has become a platform for forming public opinion. Surveys have shown that more people get their news from social media and news websites, as opposed to print newspapers. The accessibility of social media allows public opinion to be formed by a broader range of social movements and news sources. Gunn Enli identifies the Internet's effect on public opinion as being “characterised by an intensified personalisation of political advocacy and increased anti-elitism, popularisation and populism”. Public opinion has become more varied as a result of online news sources being influenced by political communication and agenda setting.

Relationships between mass media and public opinion arise as social media becomes more widespread. This 2013 study examines the effects mass media has on poverty. This negative social construction surrounding poverty made society change from a positive viewpoint to a negative one. It analyzes how that negative social construction affects policymaking and government spending. The results indicate that public policy regarding U.S. poverty is driven by the portrayal of the poor as deserving or lazy.

This 2017 study takes a different perspective on mass media effects. The study examines the media coverage of firearm-related incidents involving children. The study identifies three main frameworks the media framed these types of incidents: blameless accidents, accidental shootings that occurred in the context of play such as hunting; criminalization, both the children and the parents were arrested and charged; and responsibilization, blame on irresponsible parents and gun owners.

Inaccurate opinion polls can affect the public opinion.

=== Role of influentials ===
There have been a variety of academic studies investigating whether or not public opinion is influenced by "influentials", or persons that have a significant effect on influencing the opinion of the general public regarding any relevant issues. Many early studies have modeled the transfer of information from mass media sources to the general public as a "two-step" process. In this process, information from mass media and other far-reaching sources of information influences influentials, and influentials then influence the general public as opposed to the mass media directly influencing the public.

While the "two-step" process regarding public opinion influence has motivated further research on the role of influential persons, a more recent study by Watts and Dodds (2007) suggests that while influentials play some role in influencing public opinion, "non-influential" persons that make up the general public are also just as likely (if not more likely) to influence opinion provided that the general public is composed of persons that are easily influenced. This is referred to in their work as the "Influential Hypothesis". The authors discuss such results by using a model to quantify the number of people influenced by both the general public and influentials. The model can be easily customized to represent a variety of ways that influencers interact with each other as well as the general public. In their study, such a model diverges from the prior paradigm of the "two-step" process. The Watts and Dodds model introduces a model of influence emphasizing lateral channels of influence between the influencers and general public categories. Thus, this leads to a more complex flow of influence amongst the three parties involved in influencing public opinion (i.e. media, influencers and general public).

Influentials shape opinion through producing testimonials, celebrity endorsements, and expert opinions. Furthermore, they also have credibility and emotional appeal. Their beliefs shaped by their experiences and academic knowledge provide a foundation to the nascent mind. Lastly, the persuasive power adds more exertion in this regard.

=== Misinformation ===
According to the Social Science Research Council, "We are in the midst of a perfect storm of misinformation, where the wrong information or lack of it can be deadly." Cognitive psychologists such as Lewandowsky et al. have defined misinformation as "any piece of information that is initially processed as valid but is subsequently retracted or corrected." There are two common types of misinformation according to Hochschild, a political scientist. There are inactive informed and active misinformed. Inactive informed is when one knows the right information but chooses to ignore it. Active misinformed is when one believes incorrect information and uses that incorrect information. People can move from active misinformed to active informed by being presented with information in ways that persuade them in an impactful way.

==== Social media misinformation ====
Social media affects public opinion as content that is created and shared can affect how individuals form an opinion on societal issues. According to Ambassador (ret.) Karen Kornbluh, senior fellow and director of the Digital Innovation and Democracy Initiative at the German Marshall Fund, Social Media has led to misinformation through radicalization to extremism. Social media platforms such as TikTok and YouTube recommend content that has the potential to spread misinformation due to the way their content algorithms are set up. Content that is more inflammatory tends to get sent out to users as it keeps them more engaged. This also allows extremist groups to coordinate and raise funds more easily.

==== Public health misinformation ====
Public health issues have become areas of misinformation within the public opinion field. According to the National Library of Medicine, "Misinformation can have negative effects in the real world, such as amplifying controversy about vaccines and propagating unproven cancer treatments." Medical misinformation has been relevant to changing public opinion in cases such as the HIV/AIDS epidemic. Originally, a myth was circulated that AIDS could be spread by touching people who were infected. This had implications for public opinion regarding AIDS policies as the misinformation around the illness led to support for restrictive policies for people infected with HIV. Vaccines have also had health misinformation associated with it. According to the National Library of Medicine, misinformation has led people to take household disinfectants, such as hydroxychloroquine, as they thought it would help to treat COVID-19. The CDC performed a survey and found that out of 502 adults, 39% of respondents performed unsafe activities to treat COVID-19.

== Relationship with public policy ==
The most pervasive issue dividing theories of the opinion-policy relation bears a striking resemblance to the problem of monism-pluralism in the history of philosophy. The controversy deals with the question of whether the structure of socio-political action should be viewed as a more or less centralized process of acts and decisions by a class of key leaders, representing integrated hierarchies of influence in society or whether it is more accurately envisaged as several sets of relatively autonomous opinion and influence groups, interacting with representative decision makers in an official structure of differentiated governmental authority. The former assumption interprets individual, group and official action as part of a single system and reduces politics and governmental policies to a derivative of three basic analytical terms: society, culture and personality.

Despite philosophical arguments regarding public opinion, social scientists (those in sociology, political science, economics and social psychology) present compelling theories to describe how public opinion shapes public policy and find myriad effects of opinion on policy using various empirical research methods. Moreover, researchers find that causal relationships likely run in both directions from opinion to policy and from policy to opinion. On the one hand, public opinion signals public preferences and potential voting behaviors to policymakers. This impact should be greater under more stable democratic institutions. It should be greatest in the realm of social policy because the public is highly motivated by potential goods and services they get from the state. On the other hand, social policy impacts public opinion. The goods and services the public gets via social policy builds normative expectations that shape public opinion. Furthermore, social policy constitutes the largest share of state spending budgets, making it an active and contentious political area. Together these theories suggest that causal effects are part of a feedback loop between opinion and policy. Using increasingly sophisticated methods, scholars are beginning to grasp and identify the feedback of opinion and policy and use this phenomenon to explain the path dependency of institutions.

For decades, the correlation between public opinion and public policy was consistently tested to examine its effects. A 1993 study argued that social construction is overlooked yet plays an important role when studying public policy. It tested the theory that social constructions influence the policy agenda, policy tools, and policy choices. Its conclusion states that social constructions help to understand the motive and decision-making behind public officials who do implement certain policies towards target populations.

In a 2004 study, they also take the approach of studying the relationship between social constructions and policy implementation. It tested the hypothesis that negatively constructed social groups such as criminals are the foundation of policy implementation. Its conclusion the politically powerless and negatively perceived groups receive the least benefits in the policy process, showing that social constructions and social power do play an important role in the political policy implementation process.

In a 2012 study, instead of analyzing public opinion and policy implementation, it analyzes how the public's participation plays a role in policy implementation. It is said to be one of the first large-scale empirical examinations regarding citizen involvement in policy. Its results indicate that between democratic and administrative decision-making, there is a trade-off. Citizen input provides administrators with important and valuable information. Citizen input also helps to improve the efficiency and effectiveness of public programs. However, there is no trade-off in values between democracy and bureaucracy.

In a 2015 study, the study examined the role that social constructions and policy implementation has on obesity while analyzing obesity narratives. Their findings suggest that social constructions of target populations do play an important role. Its role is to create an emotional response towards individuals to push implementation towards supportive policies and benefit positively constructed populations, while also pushing policies that punish the negatively constructed populations.

== Relationship with foreign policy ==
As with public policy, public opinion also has a close relationship with foreign policy. There is much debate concerning what the relationship is and the study of foreign policy's relationship with public opinion has evolved over time, with the Almond–Lippmann consensus being one of the first attempt to define this relationship. Published before the Vietnam War, Gabriel Almond and Walter Lippmann argued that public opinion about foreign policy was unstructured, incoherent, and highly volatile, and that public opinion shouldn't influence foreign policy. More recent studies have rebuked the Almond-Lippmann Consensus, showing how people's opinions are generally stable, and that while individuals may not be entirely informed about every issue, they still act efficiently and rationally.

People's judgments about issues are often based on heuristics, which are mental shortcuts that allow rational decisions to be made quickly. Heuristics apply to public opinion about domestic as well as foreign policy. The deductive heuristic is one that relies on a person's core values and social groups. Delegative heuristics are influenced by figures of authority such as the media or president.

Another key theory about how people form their opinions on foreign policy issues is Jon Hurwitz and Mark Peffley's hierarchical attitudes model. They argue that it is structured, with core values providing the basis for postures which further influence the ultimate issue position. Public opinion about foreign policy is measured in the same way that all public opinion is measured. Through polls and surveys, respondents are asked about their issue positions. Conclusions are drawn by researchers by applying the scientific method.

== Relationship with U.S. presidency ==
According to Robert Shapiro, public opinion and policy-making are fundamental to a democracy, which is linked to electoral accountability, meaning that the leader who was elected "will not deviate far from voters' opinion". A problem that arises when analyzing the data collected by researchers is how these issues that are "important" are selected when collecting the data about public opinion. It is hard to determine if there has been underdevelopment of certain issues. Another concern is how elites influence public opinion by persuasion and rhetoric, ultimately shaping policy-making. These two variables are ambiguous by nature and make it hard to draw any conclusions, in most cases beyond the limits of research. Other variables to look at when analyzing the opinion-policy effect are the size of the majority public, election cycle time, degree of electoral competition, and the type of issue. For example, domestic affairs public opinion will be of greater importance than that of foreign affairs because of the complexity.

Since presidents have the ability to influence their political agenda, it is easier for them to respond to public opinion. Since they are not an institution (like Congress), they can also "shift the standards by which the public evaluates their performance in office – away from policy concerns and towards more symbolic activities, image, and personality".

A study by James N. Druckman and Lawrence R. Jacobs discusses how presidents collect their information for policymaking. They found that on one hand, they collect data about the public's preference on salient matters like crime and the economy. This reflects a populist type of democracy where the government portrays respect toward the people's views and they are connected. On the other hand, government institutions and elites believe the general population's understanding of certain issues is limited; therefore they exercise autonomy when making these decisions.

Baum and Kernell have stated that a challenge that modern presidents face when trying to persuade public opinion is that there is so many different types of media that getting people's attention is hard. New media alternatives has also caused on effect on presidential leadership as they now use them to be able to communicate with younger generations, but targeting small groups of people.

== Measurement ==
The rapid spread of public opinion measurement around the world is a reflection of the number of uses to which it can be put. Public opinion can be accurately obtained through survey sampling. Both private firms and governments use opinion polls to inform public policies and public relations.

== See also ==
- Court of public opinion
- Free and fair election
- General will
- Median voter theorem
- National interest
- Public interest
  - Public interest accounting
- Public sphere
- Political spectrum
- Public figure
- Vox populi

Organizations

- American Association for Public Opinion Research
- ESOMAR
- Roper Center for Public Opinion Research
- World Association for Public Opinion Research
- European Survey Research Association
- List of polling organizations

== Bibliography ==
- Bernays, Edward L., Crystallizing Public Opinion, 1923.
- Bianco, William T., and David T. Canon. "Public Opinion." In American Politics Today. 3rd ed. New York: W.W. Norton, 2013.
- Burstein, Paul. "The impact of public opinion on public policy: A review and an agenda." Political research quarterly 56.1 (2003): 29-40.
- Cantril, Hadley and Mildred Strunk, eds. Public Opinion, 1935–1946 (1951), massive compilation of many public opinion polls online
- Dicey, Albert Venn. Lectures on the Relation between Law and Public Opinion in England during the Nineteenth Century (edited and with an Introduction by Richard VandeWetering (Liberty Fund, 2008). introduction
- Erikson, Robert S., and Kent L. Tedin. American public opinion: Its origins, content, and impact (Routledge, 2019).
- Fishkin, James S. The voice of the people: Public opinion and democracy (Yale University Press, 1997) online.
- Gunn, J. A. W. "Public Spirit to Public Opinion" in Gunn, From: Beyond Liberty and Property: The Process of Self-Recognition in Eighteenth-Century Political Thought (McGill-Queen's University Press,1983) pp. 260–316. online
- Habermas, Jürgen, The Structural Transformation of the Public Sphere, 1989 (Strukturwandel der Öffentlichkeit, Neuwied 1962).
- Harris, Tim. "Publics and participation in the three kingdoms: was there such a thing as "British public opinion" in the seventeenth century?." Journal of British Studies 56.4 (2017): 731-753.
- Herbst, Susan. "The history and meaning of public opinion." in New directions in public opinion (Routledge, 2015). 43-55.
- Lippmann, Walter, Public Opinion, (1922). online
- MacKenzie, John M. Propaganda and empire: The manipulation of British public opinion, 1880–1960 (Manchester university press, 2017).
- Powell, Norman John. Anatomy of Public Opinion, (New York, Prentice-Hall, 1951).
- Shapiro, Robert Y. "Public opinion and American democracy." Public Opinion Quarterly 75.5 (2011): 982-1017.
- Shamir, Jacob and Michal Shamir. The Anatomy of Public Opinion (Ann Arbor: University of Michigan Press, 2000).
- Speier, Hans. "Historical development of public opinion." American Journal of Sociology 55.4 (1950): 376-388. JSTOR 2772299
- Stimson, James. Public opinion in America: Moods, cycles, and swings (Routledge, 2018).
- Théry, Julien. ,"Fama : Public Opinion as a Legal Category. Inquisitorial Procedure and the Medieval Revolution in Government (12th-14th centuries)", in Micrologus, 32 (« 'Dicitur'. Hearsay in Science, Memory and Poetry »), 2024, p. 153-193, online
- Thompson, James. British Political Culture and the Idea of ‘Public Opinion', 1867–1914 (Cambridge UP, 2013). online
- Tönnies, Ferdinand. On Public Opinion, 1970 (Kritik der öffentlichen Meinung, 1922, critical edition by Alexander Deichsel, Rolf Fechner, and Rainer Waßner, Berlin/New York: Walter de Gruyter 2003)
- Wertheim, Stephen. “Reading the International Mind: International Public Opinion in Early Twentieth Century Anglo-American Thought.” in The Decisionist Imagination: Sovereignty, Social Science and Democracy in the 20th Century, edited by Daniel Bessner and Nicolas Guilhot, (Berghahn Books, 2019), pp. 27–63. online

- (in French) Julien Théry, "Fama : l'opinion publique comme preuve. Aperçu sur la révolution médiévale de l'inquisitoire (XIIe-XIVe siècles)", in B. Lemesle (ed.), La preuve en justice de l'Antiquité à nos jours, Rennes, Presses universitaires de Rennes, 2003, pp. 119–147, online.
