= Ana Teresa Fernández =

Mexican performance artist and painter

Ana Teresa Fernández (born 1981) is a Mexican performance artist and painter. She was born in Tampico, Tamaulipas, and currently lives and works in San Francisco. After migrating to the United States with her family at 11 years old, Fernández attended the San Francisco Art Institute, where she earned bachelor's and master's of fine arts degrees. Fernández's pieces focus on "psychological, physical and sociopolitical" themes while analyzing "gender, race, and class" through her artwork.

Her work is included in the permanent collections of the Nevada Museum of Art, Denver Art Museum, the Cheech Marin Collection, the Kadist Institute, and the National Museum of Mexican Art.

== Selected works ==
=== Erasure ===
On September 26, 2014, the small town of Iguala, Mexico made national headlines when 43 college students were brutally abducted and slain. According to a Time magazine article, "corrupt police and cartel thugs in the town of Iguala went on a killing spree." Although she didn't know any of these victims of violence personally, Fernández tackled this tragedy through an installation entitled Erasure. The installation includes paintings, sculpture, text, as well as a performance. A video and photographs from the performance where Fernández paints the entirety of a room black and proceeds to paint herself black until nothing but her piercing green eyes are visible. In a 2017 interview for the Denver Art Museum, Fernández speaks about Erasure and the 2014 Iguala mass kidnapping explaining, "[T]hrough this absence of my identity, I was kind of wanting people to question who are these students? Who are these 43 individuals?"

Fernández depicts four paintings, one illustrating the back of the head, another uncovering the mouth, and one portraying the arms. All the paintings showcased the body parts covered entirely with black paint. The black paint symbolizes the injustice and cover-up the Mexican government had on the incident. The different body parts represent how the Mexican governments are in disarray and unable to protect the citizens of Mexico.

=== Foreign Bodies ===
In “Foreign Bodies,” the exhibition combines photography, painting, and performance to show how women's bodies became sites for both resistance and control.In the exhibit Foreign Bodies, Fernández takes on women's rights within her own culture. During her Ted Talk, Fernández spoke of traveling to the Yucatan Peninsula where a tour guide explained that a sinkhole, also known as a cenote, with beautiful blue water was actually a mass grave for girls that were sacrificed as offerings to the gods. An article was written about a team of archaeologists that went to the Yucatan Peninsula discovered evidence that the human sacrifice Fernández learned of was more than a myth about the Mayan culture. The October 2003 issue of National Geographic explains, "[N]ewly discovered skeletons have yield evidence of sacred funerary rites and human sacrifice." Shaken by this, Fernández returned to the cenote in Mexico in 2012. This time she rented a white stallion named Tequila and outfitted in stilettos and a black dress, she entered the cenote on horseback attempting to conquer nature instead of being sacrificed in it. In a 2014 interview with SF Art Enthusiast, Fernández illuminates, "I went to a sink hole in Mexico where thousands of virgins had been drowned as sacrificial offerings to the gods. I went into the sink hole and attempted to ride a wild white stallion, as a way to reclaim or change the history of that site."In one recurring image Fernandez rides a white horse through a cenote in Mexico, referencing historical power associated with conquest. Fernandez helps reclaim the feminine authority in a space historically connected to violence against women.The distorted underwater perspectives create a feeling of instability which reflects experiences of displacement and exclusion. By blending personal imagery with political symbolism, Fernandez challenges ideas of nationalism and questions who is really labeled as “foreign.”

=== Borrando la Frontera (Erasing the Border) ===
Borrando la Frontera or Erasing the Border is Fernández's most renowned performance. It is possibly also the most personal. She used shade of sky blue paint to give the illusion of camouflaging a section of the barrier at the Mexico-United States Border in San Diego into the sky and surrounding ocean. It was the same border that she crossed as a child to come to emigrate from Mexico to the United States with her family. She did this for the first time in 2011 after learning about the way undocumented people were suffering. Fernández reiterated that her piece was able to showcase the "power of utopian vision" adding a "power symbol... of the violent subjugation of Mexico." In a Hyperallergic article dated November 2, 2015, Fernández enlightened, "As immigration becomes more and more of an apparent reality with deeper problems, and intimate stories of despair and frustration get revealed, the general public is more open to listen and talk about it. And art is doing just this, opening a platform to address these issues in new ways, being open, honest, but also imaginative." Borrando la Frontera started off as an understated performance piece with photo and video documentation and transformed when she was invited by Arizona State University to continue the project at the US-Mexico border in Nogales.

Circa 2003-2004, Fernández's mother took her to Friendship Park, where the U.S./Mexico border meets and extends into the Pacific Ocean. Fernández credits this visit as being the time that inspired her to use the border as a site specific part of her work. This came full circle more recently, as both her mother and father were involved in the third performance of Borrando La Frontera. On April 9, 2016, Fernández collaborated with her parents and Border/Arte to perform Borrando La Frontera in three locations along the border: Agua Prieta, Juárez, and Mexicali. In an interview with Lakshmi Sarah for KQED, Fernández explained the impact of this third performance and installation. "It was so incredibly moving to see so many people, from so many different communities and walks of life, come together to want to be a part of something bigger. I have worked with my family before, but this time, my mom and dad helped lead Borrando la Frontera in Mexicali all on their own. I'm still feeling the immense high from it all, as well as exhaustion. You feel different, like you have a voice that can really talk back to the government and say, 'We can help paint a different reality or truth, using paint and imagination as your weapon ... no guns, no violence, just the community working together, tearing down walls with creativity.'" Ana Teresa Fernández was also featured on the book cover of All the Agents and Saints: Dispatches from the U.S Borderlands performing Borrando la Frontera.

Another interpretation of the piece stems from the way in which Fernández is dressed, "wearing a black cocktail dress and pumps," and like many of her works it critiques the labor that is forced upon Latin American women due to the persistence of the border and yet it still offers "hope".

=== Illustrations for Rebecca Solnit's Men Explain Things to Me ===
Fernández also provided illustrations Rebecca Solnit's iconic book of essays, Men Explain Things to Me. In an interview with Paul Farber for Monument Lab on June 6, 2019, Fernández described how Solnit approached her about including some of Fernández's art in her book. Fernández explains that one of the images "was a performance that I did around the time of SB 1070 in Arizona, the introduction of racial profiling. There's the hiding of identity, but then revealing of other truths in the attempt to hide your identity." She continues, articulating how her art work ties to the subject of Solnit's title essay: "And so much of that writing [Solnit's] is trying to push through that insistence of hiding the identity. That initial story that she begins with of someone insisting that they know more about the story that she wrote more than her." Solnit and Fernández have continued to partner together in various capacities, including a quote from Solnit that Fernández featured in a text installation in her exhibit Erasure as well as an exhibition catalogue essay that Solnit penned for Fernández's 2015 exhibit All or Nothing at Humboldt State University's then First Street Gallery (now Third Street Gallery).

=== Eco y Narciso I and II ===
Ana Teresa Fernández is depicted mopping a wet floor with only her hair, while wearing a black tango dress and high heels, her shoulders and back can be seen straining as she is performing a repetitive task. She completed these works of art in the year 2008 at the Rodeo Room at the Headlands Center for the Arts.

=== Troka Troka ===
Created and sculpted by immigrant workers, these old trucks are a new medium of survival. These immigrant laborers have become a class of unrecognized entrepreneurs because they create a vital and integral element of the urban ecosystem. In the Bay Area, these drivers are redefining and creating a new community that recycles. Troka Troka revitalized and customized these torn-down vehicles into colorful public works of art, highlighting the importance of their labor, and identifying a meaningful and wanted partnership within the community. Troka Troka dialogues with aesthetics of Haitian “Tap Taps”, Columbian “Chivas”, and Puerto Rican “Guaguas” that are privately owned, but are colorfully modified or sculpturally customized to serve and operate as public transportation. It is a vernacular art expression of the working class in Latino and African 3rd world countries, appreciated and loved by citizens of all social classes, as well as tourists. Fernández described the working class's jobs that are "so important in our community- it is the ecological flora and fauna of the city." Troka Troka comes from the same playful onomatopoeic naming as these other vehicles.

=== Of Bodies and Borders ===
In 2018, Ana Teresa Fernández developed her third solo exhibition, Of Bodies and Borders. In “Of Bodies and Borders,” Fernandez uses an underwater performance and paintings to examine migration and human loss throughout the 2014 Mediterranean refugee crisis. It is composed of different types of mediums, consisting of an eight-minute performance video title, Drawn below, a series of oil paintings that depicted some scenes from the video, drawings titled Gauging Gravity, and a cement installation. Fernandez filmed the project for roughly five years in various locations off the island of Poros, Greece. The video, which was later transformed into drawings and paintings, depicted Fernández in the ocean, wearing her iconic little black dress and heels, wrapped in a bedsheet trying to make herself float. Fernández explained that the bed sheet served as a metaphor "of possible rebirth as someone embarks on this journey or the other outcome, ... which is the sea taking individuals' lives and having them drown". Of Bodies and Borders is symbolic of migrants that have crossed the Mediterranean Sea, which is considered, "one of the deadliest borders in the world". The physical struggle shown in this artwork reflects the emotional exhaustion, survival, and invisibility within the dangerous migration journeys. The series explores liminal spaces between visibility and disappearance, while using water, fabrics, and darkness which symbolize uncertainty and displacement. The documentary style painting further emphasizes the tension between the human body and the environment which brings attention to migrants whose stories were often forgotten or ignored. According to the associate curator at the Perez Art Museum Miami, Maria Elena Ortiz argues that the "exhibition deals with the issue of immigration and human loss, which resonates with the current political debates in the U.S.". Besides representing migrant hardships it also is a representation of feminist issues. The little black dress and heels reflect the tribulations that women have to endure for equality.

=== At The Edge of Distance ===
Fernandez was featured in a debut solo exhibition at the Catharine Clark Gallery in July 2022. Her show At The Edge of Distance featured fifteen art pieces produced from various materials. While several of her popular works were displayed, her latest consisted of four paintings that were derived from video works. They depicted a woman in black heels, covered in a blanket who seems to be walking along the coast; she is also sometimes shown gripping a clothesline. These images allude to encounters that occur at the Tijuana and San Diego border, referencing immigration, a topic that Fernandez frequently references in her work.

Four of the artworks included a special silver, highly reflective mylar blanket, much like the ones produced by NASA. Fernandez expressed that the blanket covering the woman was produced to provide warmth and protection for astronauts while they are in space. Although, instead it is being used to isolate women and children in cells and detention-camps, at the Southern border. While the blanket is thin and lightweight, it references the desperate and heavy feeling of being separated from your loved ones and not being allowed to hug your own child. This familiar mylar blanket was also present in the artwork, The Space Between Us, which depicts two people covered in the blanket attempting to kiss one another. This work of art got featured in The Armory Show in New York City in 2022, alongside similar artists like Arleene Correa Valencia and Guadalupe Garcia.

== Solo exhibitions ==
- 2021- On The Horizon, Ocean Beach, SF, CA
  - Beyond Borders, Center for Contemporary Art Celji, Slovakia
  - Truth Farm, Miami Art Bassel, MI
  - Lands End, Fore-Site, San Francisco, CA
- 2019- Ana Teresa Fernández: Of Bodies and Borders, Grunwald Gallery, Indiana University, Bloomington, IN
- 2018- Ana Teresa Fernández: Of Bodies and Borders, Gallery Wendi Norris Offsite, Miami, FL
- 2017- Dream, Public Art Installation, YBCA, San Francisco, CA
- 2016- Ana Teresa Fernández: Erasure, Gallery Wendi Norris, San Francisco, CA
- 2015- All or Nothing, First Street Gallery, Humboldt State University, Humboldt, CA
- 2014- Foreign Bodies, Gallery Wendi Norris, San Francisco, CA
- 2012- TROKA TROKA Public Art Project, San Francisco, CA
  - La Llorona Unfabled, Stories to (Re)tell to Little Girls, Galeria de la Raza, San Francisco
- 2011- Ablution, Electric Works, San Francisco, CA
- 2007- Pressing Matters, Braunstein/Quay Gallery, San Francisco, CA

== Group exhibitions ==
- 2021- Truth Farm, Intervention Exhibition in Trump Winery, Charlottesville, VA
  - Of Here From There, Gray Area Foundation, SF CA
- 2020- Die Verwandlung- Borders are Vacillating, Center for the Future, Prague, Czech Republic
  - Somos Visibles, Yerba Buena Center for the Arts, SF, CA
  - Migration(s) and Meaning in Art, Maryland Institute College of Art, Meyerhoff Gallery, Baltimore, MD
- 2019- Counter-Landscapes: Performative Actions from the 1970s- Now, Scottsdale Museum of Contemporary Art, Scottsdale, AZ
  - Sanctuary, For-Site Foundation, Aga Khan Museum, Toronto, Canada
  - Sanctuary, For-Site Foundation, Smart Museum, Chicago, IL; Asia Society
  - Museum, New York, NY Unsettled: Art on the New Frontier, Palm Springs Art Museum, Palm Springs, CA
  - Dread and Delight: Fairy Tales in an Anxious World, Faulconer Gallery; Grinnell College's
- 2018- re: home, Minnesota Street Project, San Francisco, CA
  - Unsettled, Anchorage Museum, Anchorage, AK
  - Art Action, Modern Art Oxford, Oxford, UK
- 2017- UnDocumenta, Pacific Standard Time: LA>LA, Oceanside Museum of Art, Oceanside, CA
  - Mi Tierra: Contemporary Artists Explore Place, Denver Art Museum, Denver, CO
  - UNSETTLED, Nevada Museum of Art, Reno
- 2016- Ana Mendieta/ Threads of Influence, Arizona State University Art Museum, Tempe, AZ
- 2014- GalerÍa Sin Fronteras, National Museum of Mexican Art, Chicago IL
- 2013- Small Paintings from the Cheech Marin Collection, Museum of Contemporary Art, San Diego, CA
  - Oye Mira, Walter McBean Gallery, San Francisco Art Institute, San Francisco, CA
  - Want.Here.You.Now, Yerba Buena Center for the Arts, San Francisco, CA
- 2012- Power in Numbers, MACLA, San Jose, CA
  - Intersection for the Arts, Motion Graphics, San Francisco, CA
- 2011- Chicanitas, Snite Museum, University of Notre Dame, IN
  - Chicanitas (size doesn't matter), Mesa Contemporary Arts, Mesa, AZ
  - Cico and Chang, Intersection for the Arts, San Francisco, CA
- 2010- 40th Anniversary Show, Galeria de la Raza, San Francisco, CA
  - Off the Record, Edge Zones Art Center, Miami, FL
- 2009- Lipstick, Praxis International Gallery, New York, NY
  - Rastros y Cronicas, National Museum of Mexican Art, Chicago, IL
- 2008- Equilateral, Electric Works, San Francisco, CA
  - Bay Area Now 5, Yerba Buena Center for the Arts, San Francisco, CA KN Gallery, Chicago IL
  - National Museum of Mexican Art, Chicago IL
- 2007- Conduits of Labor, Queens Nails Annex, San Francisco, CA
  - No distance is more awesome, Galeria de la Raza, San Francisco, CA
  - Richmond Art Center, Richmond, CA

== Awards and residencies ==
- 2020- ACLU Artist in Residence
  - Best Civic Engagement 2020, Ford Foundation, SOMOS VISIBLES
- 2019- National Endowment for the Arts (In partnership with Creativity Explored)
  - Kennith Rainin Foundation Grant, San Francisco, CA
- 2018- YBCA 100, Extraordinary leaders building sustainable, equitable, and regenerative communities
- 2014- Eureka Fellowship Program, Fleishhacker Foundation, San Francisco, CA
- 2013- De Young Museum Artist Studio Residency, Kimball Gallery, de Young Museum, San Francisco, CA

== Press and publications ==
- "Nomadas" Universidad Central: Migraciones Forzadas: Artista Invitada 2021
- "Counter-Landscapes: Performative Actions from the 1970s- Now," Scottsdale Museum of Contemporary Art, Scottsdale, AZ Thursday, October 24, 2019
- "Factbox: Eight Artists Spotlighting the Human Cost of Migration", Reuters, Kate Ryan, August 1, 2019
- "Of Bodies and Borders: Ana Teresa Fernández", Grunwald Gallery of Art, Indiana University Bloomington and Gallery Wendi Norris, 2018
- "Ten Galleries and Art Spaces to Visit During Miami Art Week", Miami New Times, by Taylor Estape, December 5, 2018
- "Mi Tierra: Contemporary Artists Explore Place," Denver Art Museum, 2017
- "Ana Teresa Fernandez Paints it Away," Artillery, by Yxtra Maya Murray, March 7, 2017
- "20 Artists for the Trump Era", Artsy, January 2016
- "Women to Watch," KQED, by Lakshmi Sarah, July 2016
- "The Artists Using the US-Mexico Border as a Blank Canvas," Vice, By Michelle Marie Robles Wallace, June 29, 2016
- "Erasing the Border," The Atlantic, by Alan Taylor, June 2016
- "These Artists Tried 'Erasing' Parts of the U.S.-Mexico Border Fence," Huffington Politics, by Chris McGonigal, April 2016
- "Borrando Fronteras," La Polaka, April 2016
- "Painting away the border," Reuters, by Sandy Huffaker, April 2016
- "Can One Artist's Work Prompt Conversations About Border Politics?" KQED News, by Lakshimi Sarah, April 2016
- "Beneath The Surface," Very Nearly Almost, by Alex Quadros, March 2016
- "Vanishing border: Trump wants to build a wall, artist wants to blend it into landscape," Fox News Latino, by Rebekah Sager, March 2016
- "Mexican Artist Pays Tribute to Lost Students," SF Gate, by Kimberly Chun, March 2016
- "4 Women Makers Who Inspire Us," 7x7 Magazine, Anna Volpicelli 15 June 2015
- "Potent images capture the stolen moments of families split by migration," Women in the World in association with the New York Times, Roja Heydarpour, 6 October 2015
- "SF-Based Artist Painting the U.S.-Mexico Border to Make it Invisible," CBS San Francisco, 14 October 2015
- "Artist uses paint to protest U.S.- Mexico border wall," Al Jazeera America, 15 October 2015 (video interview)
- "Column Roundup: An artist erases the border, subversive graffiti, conflict at San Francisco Art Museums," Los Angeles Times, Caroline A. Miranda, 19 October 2015
- "Artist Ana Teresa Fernandez on Erasing the U.S.- Mexico Border with Blue Paint," Phoenix New Times, Lynn Trimble, 23 October 2015
- "Crossing Borders," Adobe Inspire, Joe Shepter, 2015
- "Interview: Ana Teresa Fernández, 'Foreign Bodies' at Gallery Wendi Norris," SF Art Enthusiast, 3 April 2014
- "Artist Ana Teresa Fernández: Art on the Border," Forum with Michael Krasny, KQED, 28 May 2014
- "Exhibition Spotlight: Ana Teresa Fernández At Electric Works, San Francisco," HuffPost Arts & Culture, 3 July 2013
- "La Llorona Unfabled: Stories to (Re)tell to Little Girls," Art Practical, Matthew Harrison Tedford, February 2011
- "First of Five SoMA Light Sculptures Unveiled Tonight," 7x7 Magazine, Kristin Smith, 27 February 2013
- "Goldies 2011: Ana Teresa Fernández," San Francisco Bay Guardian, 8 November 2011
