= Rebecca Solnit =

American writer and activist (born 1961)

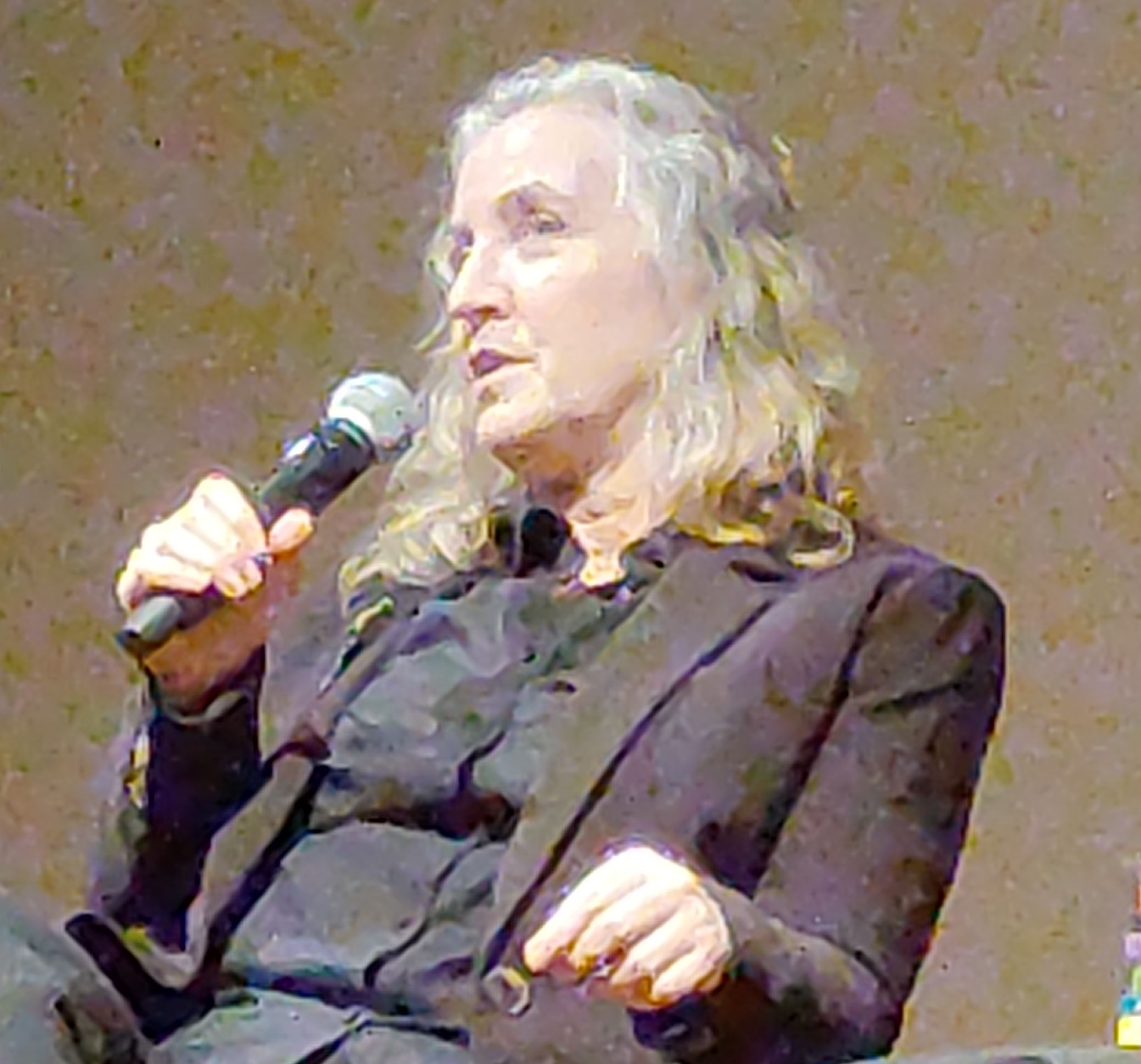
- Solnit speaking at the Internet Archive in 2026
- Born: June 24, 1961 (age 65); Bridgeport, Connecticut, U.S.
- Education: American University of Paris (attended); San Francisco State University (BA); University of California, Berkeley (MA)
- Occupations: Author; memoirist; essayist
- Writing career
- Years active: 1988–present
- Subjects: Cultural history; feminism; environmentalism; memoir
- Notable works: River of Shadows; The Faraway Nearby; A Paradise Built in Hell; Men Explain Things to Me
- Website: rebeccasolnit.net

Rebecca Solnit (born 1961) is an American writer and activist. She has written on a variety of subjects, including feminism, the environment, politics, place, and art.

Solnit is the author of twenty five books, including River of Shadows, which won the 2004 National Book Critics Circle Award in Criticism; A Paradise Built in Hell, originally published in 2009 and later revised in 2020, which charts altruistic community responses to disaster; The Faraway Nearby, a wide-ranging memoir published in 2013; and Men Explain Things to Me, a collection of essays on feminism and women's writing first published in 2014.

== Early life and education ==
Solnit was born in 1961 in Bridgeport, Connecticut, to a Jewish father and Irish Catholic mother. In 1966, her family moved to Novato, California, where she grew up. "I was a battered little kid. I grew up in a really violent house where everything feminine and female and my gender was hated", she has said of her childhood. She skipped high school altogether, enrolling in an alternative junior high in the public school system that took her through tenth grade, when she passed the General Educational Development tests.

When she was 17, she went to study in Paris at the American College in Paris (now the American University of Paris). She returned to California to finish her college education at San Francisco State University. She then received a master's degree in journalism from the University of California, Berkeley in 1984 and has been an independent writer since 1988.

== Career ==
=== Activism ===
Solnit has worked on environmental and human rights campaigns since the 1980s, notably with the Western Shoshone Defense Project in the early 1990s, as described in her book Savage Dreams, and with antiwar activists throughout the Bush era. She has discussed her interest in climate change and the work of 350.org and the Sierra Club, and in women's rights, especially violence against women.

=== Writing ===
Her writing has appeared in numerous publications in print and online, including The Guardian newspaper and Harper's Magazine, where she is the first woman to regularly write the Easy Chair column founded in 1851. She was also a regular contributor to the political blog TomDispatch and is (as of 2018) a regular contributor to LitHub.

Solnit has written seventeen books as well as essays in numerous museum catalogs and anthologies. Her 2009 book A Paradise Built in Hell: The Extraordinary Communities that Arise in Disaster began as an essay called "The Uses of Disaster: Notes on Bad Weather and Good Government" published by Harper’s magazine the day that Hurricane Katrina hit the Gulf coast. It was partially inspired by the 1989 Loma Prieta earthquake, which Solnit described as "a remarkable occasion...a moment when everyday life ground to a halt and people looked around and hunkered down". In a conversation with filmmaker Astra Taylor for BOMB magazine, Solnit summarized the radical theme of A Paradise Built in Hell: "What happens in disasters demonstrates everything an anarchist ever wanted to believe about the triumph of civil society and the failure of institutional authority."

In 2014, Haymarket Books published Men Explain Things to Me, a collection of feminist essays by Solnit on topics such as violence against women and the silencing of women. The book has been translated into many languages, including Spanish, French, German, Polish, Portuguese, Finnish, Swedish, Italian, Slovak, Dutch, and Turkish. Although Solnit's title essay is often credited with introducing the word "mansplaining"—which refers to an alleged tendency in men to assume authoritative knowledge and "explain" things, generally to women, in a condescending or patronizing way—Solnit did not use the word in the essay nor did she later express her approval of the word. Men Explain Things to Me contains illustrations by visual and performance artist Ana Teresa Fernández.

In 2019, Solnit wrote a new version of Cinderella, also for Haymarket Books, called Cinderella Liberator. In this feminist revision, Solnit reclaims Ella from the cinders and gives both the prince ("Prince Nevermind" in her version) and Ella new futures that involve thinking for themselves, acting out free will, starting businesses, and becoming friends, rather than dependent lovers. As Syreeta McFadden argued for NBC News, Cinderella has long been retold, changing with the times. Solnit's book uses Arthur Rackham's original silhouetted drawings of Cinderella.

In 2020, Solnit published Recollections of My Nonexistence, a memoir and coming-of-age narrative about her formative years in 1980s San Francisco when she found her identity as a writer, feminist, and political activist. In The New York Times review, Jenny Odell called it "an un-self-centered book that often reverses the figure-ground relationship, portraying the emergence of a writer and her voice from a particular cultural moment and set of fortuitous influences." Odell added that the "Nonexistence" of the title referred to Solnit's "instinct as a young woman to disappear, her sense that her appearance was dangerous" in an atmosphere where gender-based violence was lurking.

=== Reception ===
Solnit has received two NEA fellowships for Literature, a Guggenheim Fellowship, a Creative Capital Award, a Lannan literary fellowship, and a 2004 Wired Rave Award for writing on the effects of technology on the arts and humanities. In 2010, Utne Reader magazine named Solnit as one of the "25 Visionaries Who Are Changing Your World". Her 2013 novel The Faraway Nearby was shortlisted for the 2013 National Book Critics Circle Award.

New York Times book critic Dwight Garner called Solnit "the kind of rugged, off-road public intellectual America doesn't produce often enough....Solnit's writing, at its worst, can be dithering and self-serious, Joan Didion without the concision and laser-guided wit. At her best, however [...] she has a rare gift: the ability to turn the act of cognition, of arriving at a coherent point of view, into compelling moral drama."

For River of Shadows, Solnit was honored with the 2004 National Book Critics Circle Award in Criticism and the 2004 Sally Hacker Prize from the Society for the History of Technology, which honors exceptional scholarship that reaches beyond the academy toward a broad audience. Solnit was also awarded Harvard's Mark Lynton History Prize in 2004 for River of Shadows. Solnit was awarded the 2015–16 Corlis Benefideo Award for Imaginative Cartography by the North American Cartographic Information Society. Solnit's book, Call Them By Their True Names: American Crises, won the 2018 Kirkus Prize for Nonfiction. She won the 2019 Windham–Campbell Literature Prize in Non-Fiction. Solnit is the eleventh recipient of the Paul Engle Prize, presented by the Iowa City UNESCO City of Literature.

Solnit credits Eduardo Galeano, Pablo Neruda, Ariel Dorfman, Elena Poniatowska, Gabriel García Márquez, Virginia Woolf, and Henry David Thoreau as writers who have influenced her work.

== Bibliography ==
=== Books ===
- 1991: Secret Exhibition: Six California Artists of the Cold War Era. San Francisco: City Lights Bookstore. ISBN 9780872862548.
- 1994: Savage Dreams: A Journey into the Hidden Wars of the American West. San Francisco: Sierra Club Books. ISBN 0-87156-526-9.
- 2000: Schwartzenberg, Susan (photographer). Hollow City: The Siege of San Francisco and the Crisis of American Urbanism. London; New York: Verso. ISBN 978-1-85984-794-7.
- 2001: Wanderlust: A History of Walking. New York: Penguin. ISBN 9780140286014.
- 2003: As Eve Said to the Serpent: On Landscape, Gender, and Art. Athens: University of Georgia Press. ISBN 9780820324937.
- 2004: River of Shadows: Eadweard Muybridge and the Technological Wild West. New York: Viking. ISBN 0142004103.
- 2004: Hope in the Dark: Untold Histories, Wild Possibilities (Updated ed.). Haymarket Books. ISBN 9781608465767.
- 2005: A Field Guide to Getting Lost. New York: Viking. ISBN 9781101118719.
- 2005: Klett, Mark (photographer); Wolfe, Byron (photographer). Yosemite in Time: Ice Ages, Tree Clocks, Ghost Rivers. San Antonio, Tex: Trinity University Press. ISBN 978-1-59534-016-0.
- 2006: Klett, Mark (photographer); Lundgren, Michael (photographer); Fradkin, Philip L. "The Ruins of Memory". After the Ruins, 1906 and 2006: Rephotographing the San Francisco Earthquake and Fire. Interviewed by Breuer, Karin. Berkeley: Univ of California Press. ISBN 978-0-520-24556-3.
- 2007: Storming the Gates of Paradise: Landscapes for Politics. Berkeley: University of California Press. ISBN 9780520256569.
- 2009: Solnit, David; Solnit, Rebecca (eds.). The Battle of the Story of the Battle of Seattle. AK Press. ISBN 9781904859635.
- 2009: A Paradise Built in Hell: The Extraordinary Communities that Arise in Disaster. New York: Penguin. ISBN 9781101459010.
- 2010: Solnit, Rebecca. A California Bestiary. Illustrations by Mona Caron. Berkeley, Calif: Heyday Books. ISBN 978-1-59714-125-3. OCLC 419262718.
- 2010: Infinite City: A San Francisco Atlas. Berkeley: University of California Press. ISBN 9780520262492.
- 2011: Dillon, Brian (ed.). "The Ruins of Memory". Ruins. Documents of Contemporary Art. Vol. 25. London; Cambridge, MA: Whitechapel Gallery; MIT Press. ISBN 9780854881932.
- 2011: A Book of Migrations: Some Passages in Ireland. London: Verso. ISBN 9781844677085.
- 2013: The Faraway Nearby. New York: Penguin. ISBN 9781101622773.
- 2013: Unfathomable City: A New Orleans Atlas. Berkeley: University of California Press. ISBN 9780520274044.
- 2014: Men Explain Things to Me. Chicago: Haymarket Books. ISBN 9781608464579.
- 2014: The Encyclopedia of Trouble and Spaciousness. San Antonio: Trinity University Press. ISBN 9781595341983.
- 2014: Savage Dreams: A Journey Into the Landscape Wars of the American West. Berkeley: University of California Press. ISBN 9780520957923.
- 2016: Nonstop Metropolis: A New York City Atlas. Berkeley: University of California Press. ISBN 9780520285958.
- 2017: The Mother of All Questions. Chicago: Haymarket Books. ISBN 9781608467402.
- 2018: Call Them by Their True Names: American Crises (and Essays). Chicago: Haymarket Books. ISBN 9781608469475.
- 2018: Drowned River: The Death & Rebirth of Glen Canyon on the Colorado. Santa Fe: Radius Books. ISBN 9781942185253.
- 2019: Cinderella Liberator. Chicago: Haymarket Books. ISBN 9781608465965.
- 2019: Whose Story Is This?. Chicago: Haymarket Books. ISBN 9781642590180.
- 2020: Recollections of My Nonexistence. London: Granta. ISBN 9781783785445.
- 2021: Orwell's Roses. New York: Viking. ISBN 9780593083369.
- 2022: Waking Beauty. Chicago: Haymarket Books. ISBN 9781642598339.
- 2023: Solnit, Rebecca; Lutunatabua, Thelma Young (eds.). Not Too Late: Changing the Climate Story from Despair to Possibility. Haymarket Books. ISBN 9781642598971.
- 2025: No Straight Road Takes You There. Chicago: Haymarket Books. ISBN 9798888903636.
- 2026: The Beginning Comes After the End: Notes on a World of Change. Chicago: Haymarket Books. ISBN 979-8888904510. OL 44983800W.

== See also ==
- Fourth-wave feminism
- Women's rights in 2014
