= Men Explain Things to Me =

2014 book by Rebecca Solnit

- First edition
- Author: Rebecca Solnit
- Illustrator: Ana Teresa Fernández
- Language: English
- Subjects: Feminist theory, women's rights, media culture, media studies
- Published: May 2014 (Haymarket Books)
- Publication place: United States
- Media type: Print
- Pages: 130
- ISBN: 978-1-60846-386-2 (Paperback)
- Text: Men Explain Things to Me at Haymarket Books

Men Explain Things to Me is a 2014 essay collection by the American writer Rebecca Solnit, published by Haymarket Books. The book originally contained seven essays, the main essay of which was cited in The New Republic as the piece that "launched the term mansplaining" though Solnit herself did not use the word in the original essay and has since rejected the term. The September 2015 expanded edition of the book included two new essays: "Cassandra Among the Creeps" and "#YesAllWomen: Feminists Rewrite the Story."

== Summary ==
Each chapter is a separate essay, from various years, that sums up one key aspect of the world of women under patriarchy.

=== Men Explain Things to Me (2014) ===
The eponymous essay focuses on the silencing of women, with specific attention to the idea that men seemingly believe that no matter what a woman says, a man always knows better. This phenomenon would later be labelled mansplaining. In this essay, Solnit describes how the silencing of female voices is an infringement on female liberty and is in fact an abuse of power. With an absence of credibility to female voices in the male mind issues like violent death, abuse, harassment, and rape are often discounted. In this way, Solnit argues, female silencing is a dangerous phenomenon.

=== The Longest War (2013) ===
This essay focuses on violence against women, specifically how women are more likely to be murdered by their husbands or boyfriends, abused, raped, and assaulted/injured by men. Solnit describes how the online community also facilitates and enables this violent environment. To exemplify her argument Solnit focuses on the rape and death of Jyoti Singh in New Delhi as a very public example of the types of violence that women experience in their lives.

=== Worlds Collide in a Luxury Suite: Some Thoughts on the IMF, Global Injustice, and a Stranger on a Train (2011) ===
This essay is about Dominique Strauss-Kahn, the former managing director of the International Monetary Fund (IMF) in response to the rape of Nafissatou Diallo. In this essay, Solnit reflects on how the IMF takes advantage of formerly colonized nations much in the same way that the world rapes and takes advantage of women in less fortunate positions, equating the world with women and the IMF with men in high-up positions of power.

=== In Praise of the Threat: What Marriage Equality Really Means (2013) ===
In this essay, Solnit poses the idea that the backlash to same-sex marriage by proponents of traditional marriage comes from a place of ideological misogyny. Solnit theorizes that since same-sex marriages do not operate within the confines of traditional gender roles, they represent a threat to the traditional marriage structure, as they are unions between equal partners. In that frame of thought, it is so ingrained in patriarchal societies that women must be subservient to men that same-sex marriage would allow for the ideological emancipation of women in marriages if they were forced to be considered equals. As such, Solnit praises the perceived threat to traditional marriages that same-sex marriages pose because they demand equality in partnership, something women haven’t visibly had.

=== Grandmother Spider (2014) ===
This essay examines the symbolic annihilation of women over the course of history and under the law. Solnit describes how the disappearance of women is akin to helping to create the web of the world, but never to be caught in it. Specific examples include English marriage laws in which women were their husbands' property under the law, family trees that contain only men, and how the confinement of women to households (in the homemaker role) adds to the erasure of women in texts and in history.

=== Woolf’s Darkness: Embracing the Inexplicable (2009) ===
This essay focuses on Virginia Woolf’s influence, through her quote, “The future is dark, which is the best thing the future can be, I think.” Solnit provides a meditation on the idea of an uncertain future, which reflects how future prospects can be murky, but within those murky prospects lie untold limitless and fluid possibilities that should be embraced rather than feared.

=== Cassandra Among the Creeps (2014) ===
Using the story of Cassandra as a focal point, Solnit addresses the question of credibility—who gets to be believed and why—and how women are questioned especially when they speak out about abuse, harassment, sexual assault, and rape. This essay was previously published in Harper's Magazine.

=== #YesAllWomen: Feminists Rewrite the Story (2014) ===
In this essay, written in response to the 2014 Isla Vista killings and the #YesAllWomen social media movement, Solnit meditates on the power of naming and language throughout feminist history. Solnit touches on the coinage of now commonplace phrases such as "sexual harassment", "domestic violence", and "rape culture". This essay was first published as "Our Words Are Our Weapons" on TomDispatch.

=== Pandora’s Box and the Volunteer Police Force (2014) ===
Solnit's final essay is a combination of a warning and a call to action. Solnit writes that the fight for women’s rights is not yet over and points to the ‘volunteer police force’ of people who employ rape culture, especially online, to keep women in their place for fear of retribution. In this essay, Pandora’s box is a metaphor for the ideas of equality; for just as the spirits (i.e. women) were let out of their original box, which looked like a coffin, ideas cannot be killed.

== Reception ==
Helen Lewis of the New Statesman wrote, "I finished this book and immediately wanted to buy all the author's other works. In future, I would like Rebecca Solnit to Explain Things to Me." Kate Tuttle of The Boston Globe wrote that the book "hums with power and wit." Haley Mlotek of the National Post called it "a tool that we all need in order to find something that was almost lost." Christine Sismondo of The Toronto Star called mansplaining a civil rights issue and wrote that "[Solnit is] the perfect person to explain it to you." Soraya Chemaly of Salon wrote, "It is feminist, frequently funny, unflinchingly honest and often scathing in its conclusions." Katie Moore of the Utne Reader wrote, "At 124 pages, this collection is both an easy read and a difficult one. Easy because Solnit's writing is so eloquently full of both grace and fury—not something many writers can pull off; difficult because of the storm of appalling facts." Kirkus Reviews described the book as "slim in scope, but yet another good book by Solnit." The book also found a wide international audience. Men Explain Things to Me has been translated into many languages, including Spanish, French, German, Polish, Portuguese, Finnish, Swedish, Italian, Slovak, Dutch, and Turkish.

In 2014, Solnit, at Moe's Books in Berkeley, California, talked about her book, Men Explain Things to Me, essays on gender inequality, rape, hate crimes, Dominique Strauss-Kahn, and gay marriage.
