= Alexander Deichsel =

German sociologist

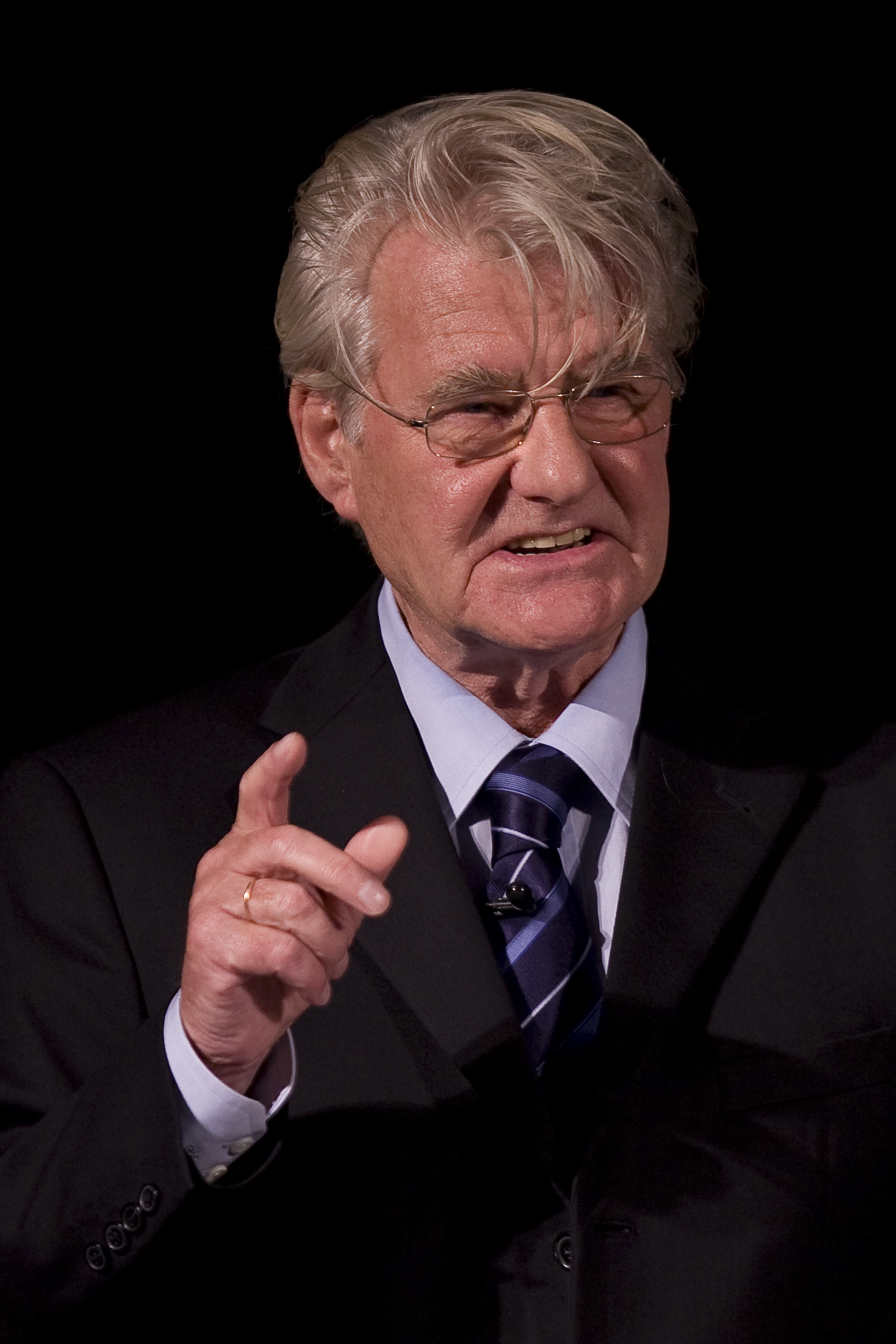
Alexander Deichsel in 2015

Alexander Deichsel (born 23 February 1935) is a German sociologist and professor at the University of Hamburg (Germany).

Deichsel completed his abitur at the Christianeum Hamburg.

He is the founder of sociology of brand (Markensoziologie) and co-editor of the Complete Works of Ferdinand Tönnies.

== Works ==
- Markensoziologie (in German), Frankfurt on Main, 2006
