= Sociology of disaster =

Field of study

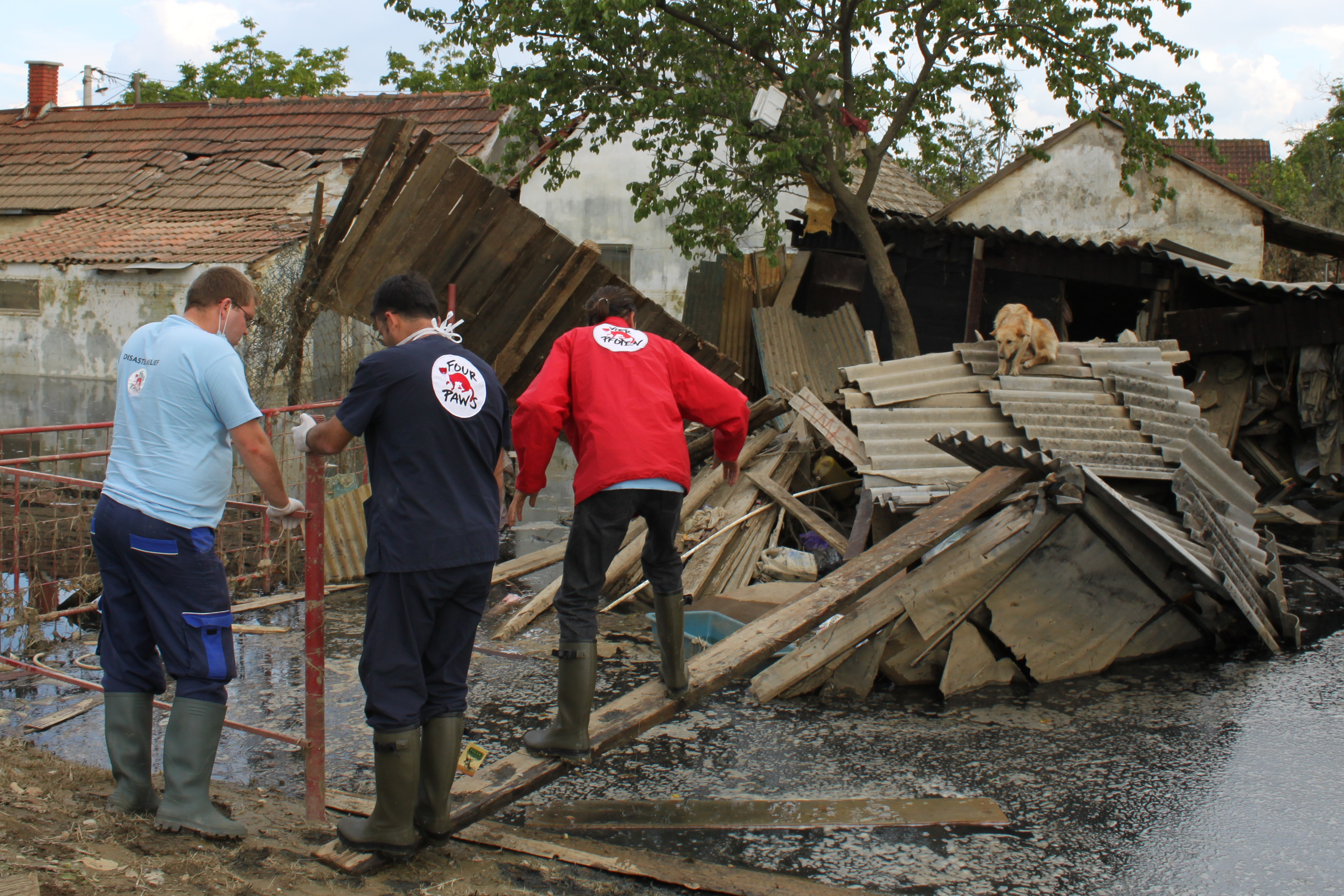
Serbia, Obrenovac - The Four Paws disaster relief team has started its mission supporting the Serbian crises team.

Sociology of disaster or sociological disaster research is a sub-field of sociology that explores the social relations amongst both natural and human-made disasters. Its scope includes local, national, and global disasters - highlighting these as distinct events that are connected by people through created displacement, trauma, and loss. These connections, whether that is as a survivor, working in disaster management, or as a perpetrator role, is non-discrete and a complex experience that is sought to be understood through this sub-field. Interdisciplinary in nature, the field is closely linked with environmental sociology and sociocultural anthropology.

== Overview ==
Many studies in the field of sociology of disaster focus on the link between social solidarity and the vulnerabilities exposed by disasters. Scholarship in this field has observed how such events can produce both social solidarity and social conflict, and more importantly, expose inequalities inherent in the social order by exponentially exacerbating its effects. Studies investigating the emotional impact of disaster state that the emotional responses in these contexts are inherently adaptive. These emotions, when reflected on and processed, lead to post traumatic growth, resilience, increased altruism, and engagement with community.

Early disaster research established the mainstream parameters of what it is to do such research - i.e. a focus on solidarity arising in the aftermath of disasters and that disasters are a consequence of human maladaptation to the hazardous environment.
