= 2017 Pulitzer Prize =

Awards for journalism and related fields

The 2017 Pulitzer Prizes were awarded by the Pulitzer Prize Board for work during the 2016 calendar year. Prize winners and nominated finalists were announced by Mike Pride at 3:00 p.m. EST April 10, 2017.

The New York Times won the most awards of any newspaper, with three, bringing its total to one hundred twelve Pulitzer Prizes. The McClatchy Company, Miami Herald, and International Consortium of Investigative Journalists won Investigative reporting, leaving them with a total of fifty-four, twenty-two, and one respectively. The New York Daily News and ProPublica won the prize in public service, bringing their totals to eleven and four, respectively. The East Bay Times won Breaking News Reporting, bringing its total to three prizes. The Salt Lake Tribune won its second Pulitzer. The Charleston Gazette-Mail won its first prize for the combined newspaper.

== Journalism ==
Public Service
New York Daily News and ProPublica "for uncovering, primarily through the work of reporter Sarah Ryley, widespread abuse of eviction rules by the police to oust hundreds of people, most of them poor minorities."
Houston Chronicle "for exposing the grave injustice of arbitrary cost-cutting by the State of Texas that denied tutoring, counseling and other vital special education services to families, hindering the futures of tens of thousands of children."
Chicago Tribune "for innovative and superbly written and illustrated reporting that not only checked perilous practices by pharmacies in dispensing prescription drugs but also prevented harm from happening in the first place."

Breaking News Reporting
East Bay Times staff "for relentless coverage of the "Ghost Ship" fire, which killed 36 people at a warehouse party, and for reporting after the tragedy that exposed the city's failure to take actions that might have prevented it."
The Dallas Morning News staff "for keeping readers informed during a chaotic shooting spree that killed five police officers and injured nine others and delivering timely, vivid and heartbreaking accounts of the horrific night."
Orlando Sentinel staff "for coverage of the mass shooting at the Pulse nightclub, including middle-of-the-night reports as partygoers hid and police prepared to storm the building and subsequent work that took readers inside the club and humanized the victims."

Investigative Reporting
Eric Eyre of the Charleston Gazette-Mail "for courageous reporting, performed in the face of powerful opposition, to expose the flood of opioids flowing into depressed West Virginia counties with the highest overdose death rates in the country."
Michael J. Berens and Patricia Callahan of Chicago Tribune "for breaking through a wall of secrecy for a gripping series that documented official neglect and uncovered wholesale abuse and 42 deaths at Illinois group homes for developmentally disabled adults.."
Steve Reilly of USA Today "for a far-reaching investigation that used two ambitious data-gathering efforts to turn up 9,000 teachers across the nation who should have been flagged for past disciplinary offenses but were not."

Explanatory Reporting
International Consortium of Investigative Journalists, McClatchy and Miami Herald "for the Panama Papers, a series of stories using a collaboration of more than 300 reporters on six continents to expose the hidden infrastructure and global scale of offshore tax havens."
Joan Garrett McClane and Joy Lukachick Smith of Chattanooga Times Free Press "for an examination of the income inequality hiding behind Chattanooga's rise as the shining star of the South – reporting that combined data, research and human stories to render a full picture of poverty."
Julia Angwin, Jeff Larson, Surya Mattu, Lauren Kirchner and Terry Parris Jr. of ProPublica "for a rigorous examination that used data journalism and lucid writing to make tangible the abstract world of algorithms and how they shape our lives in realms as disparate as criminal justice, online shopping and social media."
Staff of National Geographic "for a deep and sensitive exploration of gender worldwide, using remarkable photography, moving video and clear writing to illuminate a subject that is at once familiar and misunderstood. "

Local Reporting
The Salt Lake Tribune Staff "for a string of vivid reports revealing the perverse, punitive and cruel treatment given to sexual assault victims at Brigham Young University, one of Utah's most powerful institutions."
Jenna Russell, Maria Cramer, Michael Rezendes, Todd Wallack and Scott Helman of The Boston Globe "for a revelatory look at how the closing of psychiatric hospitals left many seriously mentally ill people a danger to themselves and their loved ones and led them into deadly encounters with the police."
Michael Schwirtz, Michael Winerip and Robert Gebeloff of The New York Times "for analyzing nearly 60,000 discipline cases and parole decisions to show that minority inmates in New York state prisons were punished at a far higher rate than white inmates."

National Reporting
David A. Fahrenthold of The Washington Post "for persistent reporting that created a model for transparent journalism in political campaign coverage while casting doubt on Donald Trump's assertions of generosity toward charities."
Renee Dudley, Steve Stecklow, Alexandra Harney and other members of the Reuters Staff "for uncovering a U.S. college admissions process corrupted by systematic cheating on standardized tests in Asia and the complicity of American officials eager to cash in on full-tuition foreign students."
The Atlanta Journal-Constitution Staff "for an extraordinary series revealing the prevalence of sexual misconduct by doctors in Georgia and across the nation, many of whom continued to practice after their offenses were discovered."

International Reporting
The New York Times Staff "for agenda-setting reporting on Vladimir Putin's efforts to project Russia's power abroad, revealing techniques that included assassination, online harassment and the planting of incriminating evidence on opponents."
Chris Hamby of BuzzFeed News "for an exposé of a dispute-settlement process used by multinational corporations to undermine domestic regulations and gut environmental laws at the expense of poorer nations."
International Consortium of Investigative Journalists, McClatchy and Miami Herald "for the Panama Papers, a series of stories using a collaboration of more than 300 reporters on six continents to expose the hidden infrastructure and global scale of offshore tax havens."
The Wall Street Journal Staff "for clear and persistent coverage that shaped the world's understanding of dramatic events in Turkey as that nation careened from a promising democracy to a near-autocracy."

Feature Writing
C. J. Chivers of The New York Times "for showing, through an artful accumulation of fact and detail, that a Marine's postwar descent into violence reflected neither the actions of a simple criminal nor a stereotypical case of PTSD."
Adam Entous and Devlin Barrett of The Wall Street Journal "for "The Last Diplomat," a multilayered thriller that took readers inside the rarely seen intersection of diplomacy and national security, telling the story of one woman's professional ruin after years of service to her country."
Eli Saslow of The Washington Post "for a nuanced and empathetic portrait of America created through human stories that chronicled the fissures, resentments, failures and disappointments that marked a divided and restive body politic."

Commentary
Peggy Noonan of The Wall Street Journal "for rising to the moment with beautifully rendered columns that connected readers to the shared virtues of Americans during one of the nation's most divisive political campaigns."
Dahleen Glanton of Chicago Tribune "for bold, clear columns by a writer who cast aside sacred cows and conventional wisdom to speak powerfully and passionately about politics and race in Chicago and beyond."
Trudy Rubin of Philadelphia Media Network "for eloquent commentary written in world hotspots from Molenbeek near Brussels to the chancelleries of Beijing, reminding Americans of the importance of the foreign beat during a year when their tendency was to turn inward."

Criticism
Hilton Als of The New Yorker "for bold and original reviews that strove to put stage dramas within a real-world cultural context, particularly the shifting landscape of gender, sexuality and race."
Laura Reiley of Tampa Bay Times "for lively restaurant reviews, including a series that took on the false claims of the farm-to-table movement and prompted statewide investigations."
Ty Burr of The Boston Globe "for a wide range of finely cut reviews of films and other cultural topics written with wit, deep sensibility and a refreshing lack of pretension."

Editorial Writing
Art Cullen of The Storm Lake Times "for editorials fueled by tenacious reporting, impressive expertise and engaging writing that successfully challenged powerful corporate agricultural interests in Iowa."
Fred Hiatt of The Washington Post "for editorials about the U.S. presidential election that stood out for their peerless moral clarity in defending American values against the normalization of bigotry."
Joe Holley and Evan Mintz of Houston Chronicle "for editorials on gun laws, gun culture and gun tragedies that combined wit, eloquence and moral power in a fine brew of commonsense argumentation."

Editorial Cartooning
Jim Morin of Miami Herald "for editorial cartoons that delivered sharp perspectives through flawless artistry, biting prose and crisp wit."
Jen Sorensen, freelance cartoonist "for a thoughtful and powerful selection of work appearing in a variety of U.S. publications and often challenging the viewer to look beyond the obvious."
Steve Sack of Star Tribune "for work that took on the biggest issues of the year through a distinctive style, close attention to detail and a sophisticated color palette."

Breaking News Photography
Daniel Berehulak, freelance photographer "for powerful storytelling through images published in The New York Times showing the callous disregard for human life in the Philippines brought about by a government assault on drug dealers and users."
Jonathan Bachman, freelance photographer "for an iconic image, published by Reuters, of one woman's simple but stout-hearted stand during a protest in Baton Rouge over the shooting by the police of a 37-year-old black man."
Photography Staff of the Associated Press "for jarring images that vividly reminded readers that the people of Iraq still live with the horrors of a war that many Americans have forgotten."

Feature Photography
E. Jason Wambsgans of Chicago Tribune "for a superb portrayal of a 10-year-old boy and his mother striving to put the boy's life back together after he survived a shooting in Chicago."
Jake May of The Flint Journal "for striking, wonderfully conceived photographs from Flint's contaminated-water crisis that told a challenging story in human terms."
Katie Falkenberg of Los Angeles Times "for a photo essay from the front lines of Brazil's war on Zika that showed the vulnerability, fear and love of mothers coping with the crisis."

== Letters, Drama, and Music ==
Fiction
The Underground Railroad by Colson Whitehead, "For a smart melding of realism and allegory that combines the violence of slavery and the drama of escape in a myth that speaks to contemporary America."
Imagine Me Gone by Adam Haslett
The Sport of Kings by C.E. Morgan

Drama
Sweat by Lynn Nottage, "For a nuanced yet powerful drama that reminds audiences of the stacked deck still facing workers searching for the American dream."
A 24-Decade History of Popular Music by Taylor Mac
The Wolves by Sarah DeLappe

History
Blood in the Water: The Attica Prison Uprising of 1971 and Its Legacy by Heather Ann Thompson, "a narrative history that sets high standards for scholarly judgment and tenacity of inquiry in seeking the truth about the 1971 Attica prison riots."
Brothers at Arms: American Independence and the Men of France and Spain Who Saved It by Larrie Ferreiro, "a book that, with flair and insight, casts the American Revolution in the fresh light of its proper context in international history."
New England Bound: Slavery and Colonization in Early America by Wendy Warren, "a groundbreaking study that alters our view of history by showing how deeply embedded slavery became in 17th-century northern colonies."

Biography or Autobiography
The Return: Fathers, Sons and the Land in Between, by Hisham Matar, "a first-person elegy for home and father that examines with controlled emotion the past and present of an embattled region."
In the Darkroom by Susan Faludi, "an extraordinary familial study of history, religion and gender that becomes, in the end, a parable of understanding and forgiveness."
When Breath Becomes Air by Paul Kalanithi, "an elegant memoir of the author's turn from gifted physician to terminal patient, told without a hint of bravado or self-pity."

Poetry
Olio, by Tyehimba Jess, "a distinctive work that melds performance art with the deeper art of poetry to explore collective memory and challenge contemporary notions of race and identity."
Collected Poems: 1950-2012 by Adrienne Rich, "a musically crafted life's work that remains as boldly relevant today as when it was written."
XX by Campbell McGrath, "a poetry collection, dazzling in ambition and sweep, leading readers on a tour of the 20th century that is both objective and personal, private and shared."

General Nonfiction
Evicted: Poverty and Profit in the American City, by Matthew Desmond, "a deeply researched exposé that showed how mass evictions after the 2008 economic crash were less a consequence than a cause of poverty."
In a Different Key: The Story of Autism by John Donvan and Caren Zucker, "a passionate work of advocacy that traces public perceptions about autism from chillingly cruel beginnings to a kinder but still troubling present."
The Politics of Mourning: Death and Honor in Arlington National Cemetery by Micki McElya, "a luminous investigation of how policies and practices at Arlington National Cemetery have mirrored the nation's fierce battles over race, politics, honor and loyalty."

Music
Angel's Bone, by Du Yun, "a bold operatic work that integrates vocal and instrumental elements and a wide range of styles into a harrowing allegory for human trafficking in the modern world. "
Bound to the Bow by Ashley Fure, "a mesmerizing orchestral piece, at once rigorous and evocative, by a sure-handed composer who takes her inspiration from Coleridge's The Rime of the Ancient Mariner."
Ipsa Dixit by Kate Soper, "a breakthrough work that plumbs the composer's fertile musical imagination to explore the relationships between idea and expression, meaning and language."
