= Jordan Mintz =

American businessman

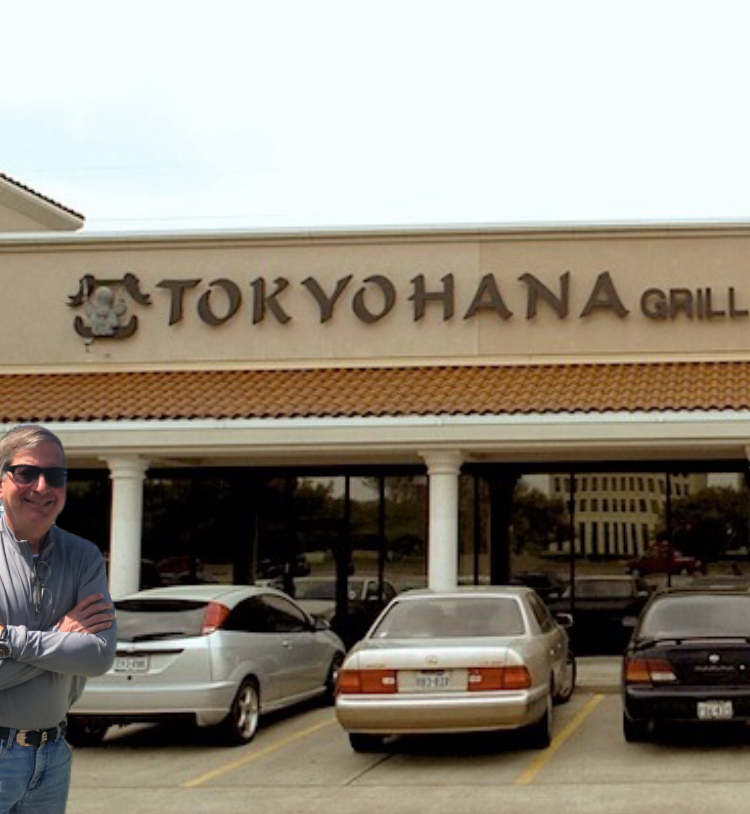
- Born: Jordan H. Mintz; August 13, 1956 (age 70); United States
- Occupations: Businessperson, lawyer
- Children: 5

Jordan H. Mintz was the former managing director for Corporate Tax at Enron and a whistleblower during the Enron scandal.

== Early life and education ==
Mintz holds an LL.M. degree from New York University School of Law, a J.D. from Boston University School of Law, and a B.S. from the University of Pennsylvania.

== Career ==
Mintz began working at Enron in 1997, where he started as vice president for Tax at Enron North America, formerly Enron Capital and Trade. He was vice president and General Counsel for Enron Global Finance from October 2000 until November 2001.

He now works at Kinder Morgan Energy Partners as vice president and Chief Tax Officer. He has also served as Senior Vice President for Tax at Centex (now PulteGroup), as a partner at Bracewell and as Senior Tax Attorney at Exxon Corporation.

=== Role as an Enron whistleblower ===
Upon moving to the Finance Department, Mintz recognized many problems at Enron and "took matters into his own hands," hiring outside legal counsel to evaluate Enron's business practices.

Mintz was also known for writing a memo to Andrew Fastow, the chief financial officer of Enron in 2000, concerning some "sweetheart" deals in favor of Mr. Fastow three months before Sherron Watkins wrote her memo, raising red flags about the growing number of improperly leveraged partnerships. In addition to expressing his concerns with Enron's business practices, he also proposed many solutions to fix the problems.

In 2002, Mintz testified before Congress, explaining that he tried in vain to ensure that Enron's deals were properly vetted by all necessary executives — including former CEO Jeff Skilling.

==== SEC issues ====
On March 28, 2007, the U.S. Securities and Exchange Commission (SEC) filed a civil complaint against Mintz, claiming that he participated in fraud in 2001 by arranging murky disclosures of Enron's repurchase of a money-losing Brazilian power plant from a partnership run by former finance chief Andrew Fastow. Mintz's lawyer, Christopher Mead of Washington, said that Mintz will fight the charges vigorously, reminding reporters: "If you can find anyone at Enron who did more to regulate the relationship between Andy Fastow and Enron, please let me know who that is."

This complaint by the SEC came as a surprise, since Mintz was praised as a whistleblower and even considered a "hero" by followers of the Enron scandal.

In 2009, Mintz resolved these charges, admitting no wrongdoing. As part of this resolution, he was banned from practicing securities law for two years and paid $25,000 civil fines and $1 in disgorgement. In 2011, he was allowed to practice securities law again.

== Personal life ==
Mintz has five children: Evan, Ally, Andrew, Carly, and Emery. Evan was a 2017 Pulitzer finalist for editorial writing at the Houston Chronicle.
