= Poverty, by America =

2023 non-fiction book by Matthew Desmond

- Author: Matthew Desmond
- Language: English
- Subject: Poverty in the United States
- Publisher: Crown Publishing Group
- Publication date: March 21, 2023
- Publication place: United States
- ISBN: 9780593239919

Poverty, by America is a 2023 non-fiction book by Matthew Desmond, a sociology professor. Published by Crown Publishing Group, it was released on March 21, 2023.

== Overview ==
Poverty, by America is a sociological analysis of poverty and its causes in the United States. Desmond's central thesis is that wealthy Americans, even those who would otherwise consider themselves progressive, tacitly benefit from government policies that keep people in poverty. Desmond also presents systemic solutions to the issue of poverty in the United States, arguing that tax reform and increasing investment in public services would reduce poverty. He also recommends that individual consumers become "poverty abolitionists" by withdrawing support "from corporations that exploit their workers" and patronize businesses that have a unionized workforce.

== Development history ==
=== Publication history ===
Poverty, by America was published by Crown Publishing Group and released on March 21, 2023.

== Reception ==
Kirkus Reviews wrote positively about Desmond's policy proposals, describing the book as a "clearly delineated guide to finally eradicate poverty in America." Booklist and BookPage similarly praised the book, singling out Desmond's solutions as a highlight. While positive overall, Eyal Press negatively compared Poverty, by America to Desmond's earlier book Evicted, criticizing Poverty, by America for being drier and containing little original research.

The Washington Post's Timothy Noah wrote positively about the book, describing it as "a darker view" than other books about poverty. Paul Gleason wrote a positive review in the Los Angeles Review of Books, noting that Desmond criticized politicians on all sides of the political spectrum, writing that "he reserves a lot of blame for his peers, the kind of people who are likely to buy his book." Historian Samuel Moyn wrote positively about the book in The Guardian, praising Desmond for his scope, but criticized his proposed solutions for lacking a concrete plan to implement them. Moyn adds that "Desmond shows that the American economy has increasingly allowed business to enjoy power to coerce people into earning less for doing more. He insists he’s not a Marxist – though he writes that raising the spectre of exploitation always makes him sound like he is." Writing in The New Yorker, Margaret Talbot said the book is "urgent and accessible," and that its "moral force is a gut punch" which should be widely read and "deserves to be one of those books you see people reading on the subway, or handing around at organizing meetings, or citing in congressional hearings."

In a mixed review of the book for Jacobin, Clark Randall writes that while its content "is not entirely lacking in truth, the way it is conceived reflects rather than challenges neoliberal ideas of subjective choice". Randall argues that Desmond retains what he sees as a pro-capitalist vision of combatting poverty, as any analysis or critique of the nature of capitalism and its contradictions is omitted, and insists that "to create a system whose primary goal is mass poverty eradication would necessitate the overthrow of the capitalist state."

In a positive review for The Nation, Marcia Chatelain writes that the book makes a strong case why we should come together "to put an end to poverty in the United States once and for all," but this can only happen (according to Desmond's argument) when we reckon with the fact that too many high and middle income Americans "enjoy financial stability as a result of the suffering of the poor," including landlords, payday lenders, employers in the service industry, and consumers themselves who "want low prices, an abundance of market options, and a plethora of gig workers to drive them to airports or clean their homes." She suggests that Desmond does not zero in on capitalism itself as the target as his objective with the book is to "bring people with disparate viewpoints and perspectives to a common place on poverty."

Dylan Matthews of Vox was critical of Desmond's core thesis, that poverty in the US has not improved in 50 years, which Matthews said is simply wrong. Matthews states that by any measure of poverty in the United States, absolute or relative, poverty has been reduced, and the only measure of poverty which does not demonstrate this is the Census Bureau's Official Poverty Measure (OPM), a measure widely regarded as extremely flawed because it fails to include non-cash poverty reduction programs. Matthews stated that Desmond marvels at the 130 percent increase in federal anti-poverty spending but fails to understand where that money went and what it accomplished.
