= Eviction Lab =

Eviction research lab at Princeton University

- The Eviction Lab at Princeton University
- Founder: Matthew Desmond
- Founded at: Princeton University
- Type: Non-governmental organization
- Purpose: to make nationwide eviction data publicly available and accessible
- Headquarters: Princeton University
- Location: Princeton, New Jersey
- Website: evictionlab.org

Eviction Lab is a Princeton University-based lab that publishes and maintains the only dataset of evictions in America, plus an interactive map that covers the years 2000 to 2018.

Its mission revolves around the idea that stable, affordable housing is essential for achieving economic mobility and overcoming poverty in the United States. The organization's dataset and research is used by journalists, teachers, community organizers, and local and national policymakers.

As a research center, part of the Department of Sociology of Princeton University, it doesn't do advocacy or promotes specific bills. The main focus of its work its in the creation of data tools and papers related to evictions, the housing crisis and homelessness.

== History ==
The Eviction Lab was founded in 2017, shortly after researcher Matthew Desmond published his Pulitzer Prize-winning book Evicted: Poverty and Profit in the American City, which was listed on The New York Times list of the 100 best books of the 21st century. He founded the organization with the support of the Gates Foundation, JPB Foundation, Ford Foundation, and Chan Zuckerberg Initiative.

In 2018, the Eviction Lab launched the first national map of evictions, which now includes eviction estimates for every county in the United States, from 2000 to 2018.

In 2020, as the COVID-19 pandemic began, the Eviction Lab created a new data tool called the Eviction Tracking System, which tracks monthly eviction filing data for specific states and cities across the country.

In 2022, the United States House Select Subcommittee on the Coronavirus Pandemic cited research by The Eviction Lab in their report, "Examining Pandemic Evictions: A Report on Abuses by Four Corporate Landlords during the Coronavirus Crisis."

In March 2024, U.S. Representative for New Jersey Bonnie Watson Coleman invited Matthew Desmond to the State of the Union speech.

== Publications ==
=== Recent Reports ===
Last updated July 22, 2024. Most recent reports can be found on this page.

- Preliminary Analysis: Eviction Filing Patterns in 2023
- More than 200,000 rural families face an eviction every year
- Eviction was a Deadly Risk During the COVID-19 Pandemic
- When Fracking Comes to Town, Evictions Follow
- Rising Rents and Evictions Linked to Premature Death
- Who is Evicted in America
- Gentrification’s Role in the Eviction Crisis
