= The Last Goodbye =

The Last Goodbye or Last Goodbye may refer to:

== Music ==
=== Albums ===
- The Last Goodbye (Escape the Fate album), 2026
- The Last Goodbye (Odesza album), 2022
- The Last Goodbye, a 2004 album by Edison

=== Songs ===
- "The Last Goodbye" (Atomic Kitten song), 2002
- "The Last Goodbye" (David Cook song), 2011
- "The Last Goodbye" (Steve Harley & Cockney Rebel song)), 2006
- "Last Goodbye" (Jeff Buckley song), 1994
- "Last Goodbye" (Da Buzz song), 2006, also album title
- "El Ultimo Adios (The Last Goodbye)", 2001 charity single
- "The Last Goodbye", a 1968 single by Chris Farlowe
- "The Last Goodbye", a song by Dead by April from Incomparable
- "The Last Goodbye", a song by Haste the Day from Burning Bridges
- "The Last Goodbye", a song by James Morrison from Undiscovered
- "The Last Goodbye", a song by Paulina Rubio from Border Girl
- "The Last Goodbye", a song by Lara Fabian from A Wonderful Life
- "The Last Goodbye", a song by Black Label Society from Shot to Hell
- "The Last Goodbye", a song by Agent Orange from Living in Darkness
- "The Last Goodbye", a song by Billy Boyd from the soundtrack of The Hobbit: The Battle of the Five Armies
- "Last Goodbye (오랜 날 오랜 밤)", a song by Akdong Musician from Winter
- "Last Goodbye", a song by Clean Bandit from What Is Love?
- "Last Goodbye", a song by Logan from First Leaf Fallen
- "Last Goodbye", a song by Union J from Union J
- "Last Goodbye", a song by Kesha from Warrior
- "Last Goodbye", a track from the soundtrack of the 2015 video game Undertale by Toby Fox
- "One Last Goodbye", a song by Seventh Wonder from Mercy Falls

== Other uses ==
- "The Last Goodbye", an episode of the television series The Dead Zone
- The Last Goodbye, a 2017 virtual reality film about that follows Holocaust survivor Pinchas Gutter’s visit to the Majdanek concentration camp
- The Last Goodbye (film), a 2026 Spanish dramedy
