= Housing voucher =

Voucher for spending on rented housing

A housing voucher is a voucher that can be spent on rented housing, such as Section 8 public housing in the United States, along with universal housing vouchers. The housing choice voucher programme allows families to move without the loss of housing assistance and choose a unit anywhere in the United States if they lived in the jurisdiction of public housing agency (PHA) issuing the voucher when they applied for assistance. The book Evicted: Poverty and Profit in the American City advocates that the U.S. government issue housing vouchers to families below a certain income threshold so that they pay no more than 30 percent of their income on housing.

== See also ==
- Home mortgage interest deduction
- Subsidized housing
