= Logan (band) =

Scottish rock band

- Origin: Glasgow, Scotland
- Genres: Hard rock, post-grunge
- Years active: 2003–2014
- Past members: Mick Coll; Kenny Collins; Max McPherson; Stef Lach; Steve Reilly; Alan Reilly; Iain Stratton
- Website: www.logan-net.com

Logan were a Scottish rock band, formed in 2003 in Glasgow. The line-up consists of Kenny Collins (vocals), Max McPherson (lead guitar), Mick Coll (rhythm guitar, backing vocals) and Stef Lach (bass). They have been compared to various post-grunge bands such as Creed, Nickelback and Alter Bridge.

Logan released five studio albums – First Leaf Fallen (2003); Welcome to the Wasteland (2004); Cruel Little World (2006); Exposed (2007), and The Great Unknown (2010). Despite being unsigned, Logan have managed to sell over 30,000 albums, with two singles reaching the Top 40 in the UK Rock Singles Chart.

== History ==
Formed in March 2003, Logan, consisting of vocalist Kenny Collins, guitarist Mick Coll, bassist Michael Wilson and drummer Martin Downes, posted demos of their music on various American music forums, gaining fans in the process. One year after forming, and after having only played one gig, Logan were invited to Washington DC to showcase for music industry heavyweight Pete Ganbarg. Upon returning to the UK, the band released their debut album entitled First Leaf Fallen and were joined on drums by Iain Stratton and added a second guitarist in the form of Al Reilly. They released their second album entitled Welcome to the Wasteland in 2005, while they toured the UK, supporting Alter Bridge. Logan continued to play shows before releasing two more albums: Cruel Little World in 2006 and Exposed 2007.

In 2008, Michael Wilson departed the band, and new bass player Steve Reilly joined the team. The band supported Bon Jovi at their Hampden Park concert, before touring the UK and supporting Alter Bridge on the UK leg of their Blackbird tour. The same year, the band contributed the song "The Great Unknown" to The Jump-Off soundtrack and The Scotsman named them one of the best unsigned bands.

The band played a number of Scottish shows in March 2009 before playing two shows supporting Thunder, on their 20 Years and Out farewell tour in July. They also played at Download Festival. Logan won the Scottish Variety Award for Best New Scottish Band the same year.

They released their new album entitled The Great Unknown in 2010.

In July 2012, Logan announced via their Facebook page that guitarist Alan Reilly, bassist Steve Reilly and drummer Iain Stratton were no longer in the band, leaving founding members Kenny Collins and Mick Coll to continue building their legacy and recruit new members. In September 2012, Logan revealed that their new lead guitarist was Max McPherson. In October 2012, they announced UK Young drummer of the Year Calum Blair as their new drummer and Stef Lach as their new bass player. The group disbanded in 2014.

== Band members ==
- Mick Coll – rhythm guitar, backing vocals
- Kenny Collins – lead vocals
- Stef Lach – bass (2012–present)
- Max McPherson – lead guitar (2012–present)
- Alan Reilly – lead guitar (2004–2012)
- Michael Wilson – bass (2003–2008)
- Steve Reilly – bass (2008–2012)
- Martin Downes – drums (2003–2004)
- Iain Stratton – drums, percussion (2004–2012)
- Calum Blair – drums (2012-2014)

== Discography ==
=== Studio albums ===
Year	Album details	Peak chart positions
Year	Album details	UK
2004	First Leaf Fallen: Released: 18 June 2004	—
2005	Welcome to the Wasteland: Released: 12 December 2005	—
2006	Cruel Little World: Released: 25 September 2006; Re-Released: 27 October 2008	—
2010	Exposed: Released: 1 January 2010	—
2010	The Great Unknown: Released: 5 October 2010	—

=== Compilation albums ===
Year	Album details	Peak chart positions
Year	Album details	UK
2013	Anthology 2003–2006: Released: 15 January 2013	—

=== Singles ===
Year	Song	Peak chart positions	Album
Year	Song	UK Rock	Album
2005	"When I Get Down"	12	Cruel Little World
2006	"Hallowed Ground"	20	Cruel Little World
2010	"Jump in Again"	—	The Great Unknown

=== Music videos ===
Year	Song	Director
2008	"When I Get Down"	Seth Gardner
2010	"Somewhere"	Allen McLaughlin
