= Ashley Fure =

American composer (born 1982)

Ashley Fure (born 1982) is an American composer. She has received the Rome Prize and a Guggenheim Fellowship (2017), and her composition Bound to the Bow (2016) was a finalist for the 2017 Pulitzer Prize in Music.

== Early life ==
Fure grew up in Marquette, Michigan, attended the Interlochen Arts Academy in high school, Oberlin Conservatory of Music as an undergraduate, received her PhD from Harvard University and was a post-doctoral fellow at Columbia University. Since 2015, Fure has been an assistant professor of music at Dartmouth College.

== Career ==
Fure's orchestral piece Bound to the Bow was inspired by Samuel Taylor Coleridge's The Rime of the Ancient Mariner. Her opera The Force of Things: An Opera in Objects premiered in Darmstadt, Germany, in 2016 and was performed by the International Contemporary Ensemble at Montclair State University in Montclair, New Jersey, in 2017. The opera had its New York premiere in August 2018 at the Mostly Mozart Festival.

Fure developed The Force of Things: An Opera in Objects, about climate crisis, in collaboration with her brother, architect Adam Fure. It is staged in an installation space set up as an immersive environment, placing the audience under a canopy of latex hides and hanging objects. The music for The Force of Things is a combination of projected electroacoustic sounds and live instrumental performance. According to the New York Times, Fure and her brother "created an immersive experience that is claustrophobic and viscerally fraught. Their central invention is the use of massive subwoofer speakers that emit frequencies too low to be audible to the human ear, yet strong enough to set abuzz every object and diaphragm in the room." The Wall Street Journal wrote, "traditional musical instruments are, of course, mechanisms for vibration, and other composers have experimented with the musical properties of found objects in the past. Ms. Fure’s contribution is to suggest that the room itself was alive; that the pitches, rhythms and sensations generated by these seemingly inanimate objects have their own order and message, whether or not we can determine what it is." The New Yorker's Alex Ross wrote, "gender does not play an explicit role in The Force of Things, although Fure’s emphasis on the idea of empathy implies an opposition to the masculine megalomania of certain modernist predecessors."

Jaap van Zweden, the director of the New York Philharmonic, chose Fure's orchestra piece Filament to inaugurate his tenure in September 2018.
