= First Leaf Fallen =

Album by Logan

Studio album by Logan
- Released: July 2004
- Recorded: RedEye Studios, Clydebank
- Genre: Hard rock Post-grunge
- Length: 48:20
- Label: Stoneman
- Producer: Steve Reilly

Logan chronology
First Leaf Fallen (2004)	Welcome To The Wasteland (2005)

First Leaf Fallen is the first album from the hard rock group Logan. It was recorded at the RedEye Studios in Clydebank and was released in July 2004. As Logan are unsigned, this record was self-financed and released under the name StoneMan Records.

Much of the recording of First Leaf Fallen was done before Iain Stratton joined the band and as such, Martin Downes played drums on the songs "Like A Rain", "Life Less Lived", "Had It All", "Last Goodbye", "Time & Time Again", "When I Get Down" and "Runaway". Paul Gallagher played the piano heard on the tracks "Had It All" and "When I Get Down".

The liner notes dedicate the song "Last Goodbye" to James McCue, a Lance Corporal who was a casualty in Iraq. He was personal friend of the band.

The track "Like A Rain" was re-recorded and subsequently appeared on the second Logan album, Welcome To The Wasteland, this time featuring Iain Stratton on drums. "When I Get Down" has also been re-recorded and was part of Logan's third album, Cruel Little World, from which it was the group's first single.

The album has since been pulled out of circulation due to the band's opinion that it did not live up to the material found on later releases.

== Track listing ==
1. "Like A Rain" – 3:52
2. "Life Less Lived" – 4:48
3. "Had It All" – 4:02
4. "Last Goodbye" – 4:48
5. "Time & Time Again" – 4:46
6. "With Me" – 4:11
7. "When I Get Down" – 4:52
8. "Runaway" – 4:34
9. "Somewhere" – 3:27
10. "Stand Up" – 4:25
11. "She'll Never Know" – 4:35
