= Mark Robert Rank =

American sociologist

- Other name: Mark R. Rank
- Occupations: Social scientist, Professor
- Years active: 1984-present
- Known for: Poverty expert
- Awards: American Academy of Social Work and Social Welfare Fellow (November 10, 2012)

Academic background
- Education: University of Wisconsin-Madison (B.A 1978, M.A. 1980, Ph.D. 1984)

Academic work
- Discipline: Sociologist
- Sub-discipline: Poverty, social welfare, economic inequality and social policy
- Institutions: Washington University in St. Louis
- Notable works: Living on the Edge: The Realities of Welfare in America (1994); One Nation, Underprivileged: Why American Poverty Affects Us All (2005); Chasing the American Dream: Understanding What Shapes Our Fortunes (2014)

Mark Robert Rank is a social scientist and Herbert S. Hadley Professor of Social Welfare at George Warren Brown School of Social Work at Washington University in St. Louis, known for his work on "poverty, social welfare, economic inequality and social policy". He wrote One Nation, Underprivileged: Why American Poverty Affects Us All.

== Publications ==
=== Living on the Edge: The Realities of Welfare in America (1994) ===
Living on the Edge "explored the conditions of surviving on public assistance". It was published at a time of heated "debate over welfare reform" — a central pledge of President Bill Clinton's campaign. Clinton was under pressure at the time from Newt Gingrich and the Republican Party to approve welfare reform legislation. In a 1996 review of Living on the Edge, Katherine S. Newman praised Rank's research and methodologies that "demolishe[d] myths" about "fast-disappearing safety net we call the welfare system" composed of Aid to Families with Dependent Children (AFDC), Supplemental Security Income (SSI), Medicaid, and food stamps. Newman said that Rank revealed how much assumptions about the U.S. welfare population, such as ""who uses the system, for how long, and why", were "far off the mark." He dismantled the "largely unsubstantiated claims about the belief systems or values of recipients (and the formative contributions of welfare payments to a "culture of dependency." She described how Rank had used an "ecelectic" mix of methods in his "longitudinal analysis of statewide caseload of 3,000 households" — statistics, subjective accounts with in-depth interviews with 50 families "on aid", fieldwork in welfare offices, and had drawn from Wisconsin statewide data for 1980-1988 from different sources.

=== One Nation, Underprivileged: Why American Poverty Affects Us All (2005) ===
"Despite its enormous wealth, the United States leads the industrialized world in poverty."

— OUP. 2005. One Nation, Underprivileged.

One Nation, Underprivileged provided a "new understanding of poverty in America". One Nation, Underprivileged earned the "Honorable Mention for Outstanding Book Awards 2005 by The Gustavus Myers Center for the Study of Bigotry and Human Rights". According to the University of Oxford Press, Rank provided "a new paradigm for understanding poverty, and outline[d] an innovative set of strategies [to] reduce American poverty. One Nation, Underprivileged represents a profound starting point for rekindling a national focus upon America's most vexing social and economic problem."

=== Chasing the American Dream: Understanding What Shapes Our Fortunes (2014) ===
The book titled Chasing the American Dream which Rank co-authored with two other social scientists — Thomas A. Hirschl from Cornell University and Kirk A. Foster — won the "2016 Society for Social Work and Research Book Award". The authors used a "multi-methodological approach to explore the nature of the American Dream and the economic viability of achieving the Dream". They "analyzed social mobility at the lower end of America's economic spectrum". They investigated the "percentage of Americans that "achieved affluence", "how much income mobility [Americans] actually have", home ownership, and why "nearly 80 percent of [Americans] "experience significant economic insecurity at some point between ages 25 and 60", and how "access to the American Dream be increased".

"Combining personal interviews with dozens of Americans and a longitudinal study covering 40 years of income data, the authors tell the story of the American Dream and reveal a number of surprises. The risk of economic vulnerability has increased substantially over the past four decades, and the American Dream is becoming harder to reach and harder to keep."

— OUP on Chasing the American Dream

The American Dream is "fundamental to the essence of America... It has captured the imagination of people from all walks of life and represents the heart and soul of the country". Three core components of the American Dream are the "freedom" and "opportunity" to "pursue one's interests and passions in life". A second element of the Dream is "economic security and well-being" — "having the resources and tools to live a comfortable and rewarding life", "working at a decent paying job", "provid[ing] for your children", "owning a home", "having some savings in the bank, and being able to retire in comfort".

"These are seen as just rewards for working hard and playing by the rules. Individuals frequently bring up the fact that hard work should lead to economic security in one's life and in the life of one's family. This is viewed as an absolutely fundamental part of the bargain of what the American Dream is all about."

— Rank. 2014. What is the American Dream?

The third component of the American Dream, is having "hope", "confidence", optimism" and an "abiding faith in progress" that applies "to one's own life", the "lives of one's children and the next generation, as well as to the future of the country as a whole".

In a review of Chasing the American Dream by British Association for American Studies (BAAS), Benjamin Sporle described how the authors used "a series of occasionally shocking statistics" to "challenge some of the pre-conceived ideas about the attainability of the American Dream". While many of those interviewed for the book still "believe[d] that hard work should result in economic security", the authors were "careful to explain that whilst this may have been the case in previous generations, it [was] no longer a guaranteed formula for success." Their findings revealed that 80% of Americans would "experience at least one year of significant economic insecurity between the age of 25 and 60". Sporle cited their findings that the "American Dream [was] in reality harder for everyone than at any time over the past four decades of statistics examined, including the average white male. Median wages for this section of society peaked as far back as 1973." Men had "lost ground in terms of wages over the course of four decades, despite an increase in output per employee".

== Economic risk calculator ==
Twelve "percent of the population will find themselves in the top 1 percent of the income distribution for at least one year" but a "mere 0.6 percent will do so in 10 consecutive years"... 39 percent of Americans will spend a year in the top 5 percent of the income distribution, 56 percent will find themselves in the top 10 percent, and a whopping 73 percent will spend a year in the top 20 percent of the income distribution".

— Rank. 2014. The New York Times

By 2016, ordinary citizens, academics and policy makers were preoccupied with two economic issues in particular: "widespread economic insecurity and soaring levels of income inequality". Based on "44 years of longitudinal data regarding individuals from ages 25 to 60" Rank and Hirschl studied how many Americans would experience "different levels of affluence during their lives". According to Rank, between the early 1970s and 2014, "those in the top 20 percent... experienced real economic gains" and the "gap between the top and bottom of the income distribution" in the United States "expanded significantly". Gains were "heavily concentrated in the top 10, 5 and — most famously — 1 percent". However, the United States does not have "static, income-based social tiers... [A] large majority of people will experience either wealth or poverty — or both — during their lifetimes.

In 2009, Rank, Hirschl and Daniel A. Sandoval co-authored an article on poverty and life course research in Demography in which they examined how the dimensions of "poverty incidence, chronicity, and age pattern" changed from 1968 to 2000. Using "hundreds of thousands of case records taken from a longitudinal study of Americans that began in 1968" — Panel Study of Income Dynamics (PSID) — to study the "life course dynamics of relative poverty over time". The PSID is "nationally representative of the non-immigrant U.S. population." Their "empirical results" suggested that the "risk of acute poverty increased substantially, particularly in the 1990s" particularly "for individuals in their 20s, 30s, and 40s; for all age groups with respect to extreme poverty; and for white males". The Census Bureau's data showed "little overall change in the U.S. poverty rate from 1968 - 1998 in contrast to their findings using the "life course approach." Their findings reveal "a rising economic risk of acute poverty for individuals, one that is consistent with recent observations and research suggesting that a growing number of Americans will eventually find themselves in an economically precarious position". Their claim is corroborated by other analysts who have revealed "indicators and patterns over the [same] three decades. They cite weakened "job security", more Americans who were "without health care", increased "income volatility and downward mobility", a "seriously eroded" "social safety net", stagnation in men's earnings, the widening gap in income and wealth inequality, and a record high level of consumer debt. They demonstrated "for the first time that the risk of American poverty had become "exceedingly high" and had "increased substantially during the 1990s in comparison with the 1970s and 1980s". "[P]overty has become a routine and unfortunate part of the American life course".

== Common myths about poverty in America ==
In a November 2, 2013 op-ed for The New York Times, Rank dispels common assumptions about poverty in America. These include, the "notion that poverty affects a relatively small number of Americans, that the poor are impoverished for years at a time, that most of those in poverty live in inner cities, that too much welfare assistance is provided and that poverty is ultimately a result of not working hard enough". He asserts that poverty in the U.S. is mainstream and the "likelihood of experiencing relative poverty at least once in their lifetime is surprisingly high".

Based on "factors like race, education, marital status and age", they "constructed an [riskcalculator.org economic risk calculator]" through which an individual could assess their "chances of experiencing poverty in the next five, 10 or 15 years." In 2015, the poverty line in the United States for a family of four was about $24,000."

By 2013, "nearly 40 percent of Americans between the ages of 25 and 60 will experience at least one year below the official poverty line during that period ($23,492 for a family of four), and 54 percent will spend a year in poverty or near poverty (below 150 percent of the poverty line)." By 2015, Rank and Hirschl reported that "24.9 percent of the [U.S.] population will encounter five or more years of poverty, and 11.4 percent will experience five or more years of extreme poverty".
