= Evan Mintz =

American journalist

- Born: Houston, Texas, U.S.
- Education: Rice University (BA); Benjamin N. Cardozo School of Law (JD)
- Occupation: Journalist
- Writing career
- Language: English
- Period: 2012–present

Evan Mintz is an American journalist and lawyer.

Mintz joined the editorial board of the Houston Chronicle in 2012, where he was promoted to deputy opinion editor before his 2019 departure. Elsewhere, his writing appears in Scientific American, Texas Monthly, the Texas Observer, and Houstonia.

In 2017, Mintz was named a finalist for the Pulitzer Prize for Editorial Writing (alongside Joe Holley, also of the Chronicle) for his work "on gun laws, gun culture and gun tragedies that combined wit, eloquence and moral power in a fine brew of commonsense argumentation."

He currently serves as the Houston Chronicle's editor of Opinion and Community Engagement, a role he assumed upon his return to the newspaper in July 2025.

== Early life and education ==
Mintz was born in Houston, Texas, to Jordan H. Mintz, a tax lawyer known for whisteblowing during the Enron scandal, and Lauren D. Mintz. He graduated from St. John's School in 2004, where he was a writer and cartoonist for the school newspaper. Mintz said he received death threats from the St. Johns community in response to an article he wrote titled "Chapel’s Religious Nature is Inherently Wrong," in which he critiqued the school's mandatory (non-denominational) daily chapel service.

In 2008, Mintz received his B.A. in history from Rice University. An undergraduate at Hanszen College, he served as executive editor of The Rice Thresher, where received the Bobb Award for writing and journalism (a staff-voted award recognizing that year's best news and features story). Previously, he served as opinion editor and Backpage editor (the Thresher's satire section).

He received his J.D. from the Benjamin N. Cardozo School of Law in New York City and served on the editorial board of the Cardozo Jurist (an independent, student-run newspaper). In his summers as a law student, he interned at the American Civil Liberties Union of Texas.

== Career ==
Mintz is a licensed attorney. After graduating from law school, he began his legal career at the Harris County District Attorney’s Office. He left the District Attorney's Office in 2011 when he started contributing to the Houston Chronicle as a freelance writer, joining full-time in 2012. Mintz was a 2017 Pulitzer finalist in editorial writing.

In May 2018, Mintz was named deputy opinion editor for the Chronicle. Mintz left the newspaper in 2019 to join Houston-based philanthropy Arnold Ventures, where he managed content creation and later became director of communications, a position he held until his 2025 departure. At Arnold Ventures, Mintz supported policy change efforts in favor of higher education reform, affordable housing, accountable policing, health care affordability, bail reform, and gun safety, among other causes.

In June 2025, the Houston Chronicle announced Mintz's appointment as editor of Opinion and Community Engagement.

== Personal life ==
Mintz married his wife Melissa Goldberg, a clinical psychologist, in January 2016. They connected through JDate in 2011, but they had known each other prior as children since their mothers were sorority sisters.
