= Steve Reilly =

American journalist

Steve Reilly is an American investigative reporter for USA Today known for his investigation into flaws in the national educator background check system, which was a finalist for the 2017 Pulitzer Prize for Investigative Reporting.

== Education and career ==
Reilly grew up in Downingtown, Pennsylvania and graduated from Vassar College in 2009.

Reilly began his career at newspapers in Pennsylvania and New York. His reporting for the Press & Sun-Bulletin was awarded the Distinguished Investigative Reporting Award of Excellence by the New York News Publishers Association. He was a finalist for the Livingston Award for Local Reporting for a 2014 report on workers in New York paid less than minimum wage.

Reilly joined USA Today as an investigative reporter in 2014. In 2015, he led a reporting project the Columbia Journalism Review described as a “massive investigation” which identified more than 70,000 untested rape kits held by local and state law enforcement agencies in the United States. The investigation was followed by local reforms and new legislation in at least 20 states addressing protocols for handling sexual assault evidence. Reilly was a finalist for the 2016 Livingston Award for National Reporting for the investigation.

In 2017, Reilly was named a finalist for the Pulitzer Prize for Investigative Reporting "for a far-reaching investigation that used two ambitious data-gathering efforts to turn up 9,000 teachers across the nation who should have been flagged for past disciplinary offenses but were not." The series led to national reforms for background check system for educators. According to USA Today, it marked the first time the newspaper was recognized as a finalist in the investigative reporting category of the Pulitzer Prizes.

Reilly has reported on the business operations of President Donald Trump, including a report detailing allegations that Trump's companies failed to pay bills to hundreds of contractors and workers and a 2018 report on a newly formed corporation selling Trump-brand merchandise. He has also shared with colleagues the Knight-Risser Prize for Western Environmental Journalism and recognition from the Overseas Press Club and Education Writers Association.

== Awards ==
- 2017 Finalist for the Pulitzer Prize for Investigative Reporting
- 2016 Finalist for the Livingston Award for National Reporting
- 2015 Finalist for the Livingston Award for Local Reporting
- 2012 New York News Publishers Association Distinguished Investigative Reporting Award of Excellence
