= Evicted: Poverty and Profit in the American City =

2016 non-fiction book by Matthew Desmond

- Cover of first edition
- Author: Matthew Desmond
- Audio read by: Dion Graham
- Cover artist: Nina Mangalanayagam (floor photo); Pavel Shynkarou (wall photo); Jake Nicolella (design)
- Language: English
- Subject: Sociology, poverty, low-income housing
- Set in: Milwaukee, Wisconsin, U.S.
- Publisher: Crown
- Publication date: March 2016
- Publication place: United States
- Media type: Print (hardback)
- Pages: 432
- Award: Pulitzer Prize for General Nonfiction
- ISBN: 978-0-553-44743-9
- OCLC: 936126297
- Dewey Decimal: 339.4/60973
- LC Class: HD7287.96.U6 D47 2016
- Website: www.evictedbook.com

Evicted: Poverty and Profit in the American City is a 2016 nonfiction book by American sociologist Matthew Desmond. Set in the poorest areas of Milwaukee, Wisconsin, during the 2008 financial crisis and its immediate aftermath, the book follows eight families struggling to pay rent to their landlords, many of whom face eviction. Through a year of ethnographic fieldwork, Desmond's goal is to highlight the issues of extreme poverty, affordable housing, and economic exploitation in the United States.

Evicted was well-received and won multiple book awards such as the 2017 Pulitzer Prize for General Nonfiction and the Robert F. Kennedy Book Award. The Pulitzer committee selected the book "for a deeply researched exposé that showed how mass evictions after the 2008 economic crash were less a consequence than a cause of poverty".

== Background ==
In an interview with The Atlantic, author Matthew Desmond expresses his goal of writing about poverty through the lens of eviction, focusing on relationships and interactions among landlords, tenants, and judges. According to Desmond, evictions acts "as a cause, not just a condition, of poverty". He picked the setting of Milwaukee believing that it captures a broad national experience from an under-represented urban city.

== Summary ==
Set in Milwaukee, Wisconsin, Matthew Desmond tells the story of eight families and their experiences with eviction and poverty. The families are diverse in race, age, and gender, yet all struggle with rent payments, which consume the majority of their already meager income.

Arleen Belle, a member of one of the eight families Desmond documents, is a Black single mother struggling to secure housing with her low income. Lamar, a Black man who had lost both of his legs, has to look after a group of boys while burdened with debt. Scott, a white male nurse, struggles to pay rent in a trailer park while struggling with heroin addiction. The book is centered around the families’ interactions with their two landlords: Sherrena and Tobin. Through following the lives of these families and individuals, Desmond illustrates the psychological, legal, and discriminatory aspects of eviction and how it is intertwined with poverty.

Desmond advocates for a universal housing voucher program from the U.S. government for families below a certain income threshold so that they pay no more than 30 percent of their income on housing.

== Genre and style ==
According to Jennifer Senior from The New York Times, Evicted "is a regal hybrid of ethnography and policy reporting". To complete this book, Desmond conducted fieldwork in Milwaukee from 2008 to 2009; he first lived in a trailer park known as Central Mobile Home Park to observe the residents, followed by a rooming house on the north side of the city run by Sherrena and her husband Quentin. After interviewing Milwaukee renters and defendants in eviction courts and analyzing court records, Desmond began drafting Evicted.

== Analysis ==
Historian Thomas Jackson credits Desmond for “[combining] simple, powerful narrative with vivid characterization and quantitative rigor,” which is reflected in the footnotes containing substantial quantitative and qualitative survey data. Furthermore, Desmond illustrates how groups such as black women and children are disproportionately subjected to evictions and housing discrimination.

Sociologist David J. Harding applauds Desmond’s clear illustration of the causal relationship between eviction and the vicious cycle of poverty, while also outlining two points of controversy from an academic perspective: 1) the potential attribution or misinterpretation of poverty to the problematic personal lives of the families and 2) Desmond’s direct involvement with the subjects. Regarding the first point, Harding defends the book by arguing that conditions such as domestic violence and drug abuse are likely symptoms rather than causes of poverty. Second, Harding emphasizes that it is unlikely for Desmond to drastically change the lives of his subjects only with a few incidences of intervention.

== Critical reception ==
Bill Gates describes Evicted as "a brilliant portrait of Americans living in poverty" through its focus on people and the transformation of quantitative data into stories.

Katha Pollitt from The Guardian writes that: "I can’t remember when an ethnographic study so deepened my understanding of American life." She praises Desmond’s narrative approach in research and his demonstration of the intersection of housing, eviction, and poverty.

Christian Schneider, writer for the Milwaukee Journal Sentinel, questions eviction as a root cause of poverty and argues that "eviction simply exacerbates the existing dysfunctions many of these people already carry with them", including drug abuse, physical disability, domestic violence, and unemployment. Schneider describes housing insecurity as a "link" rather than a fundamental cause.

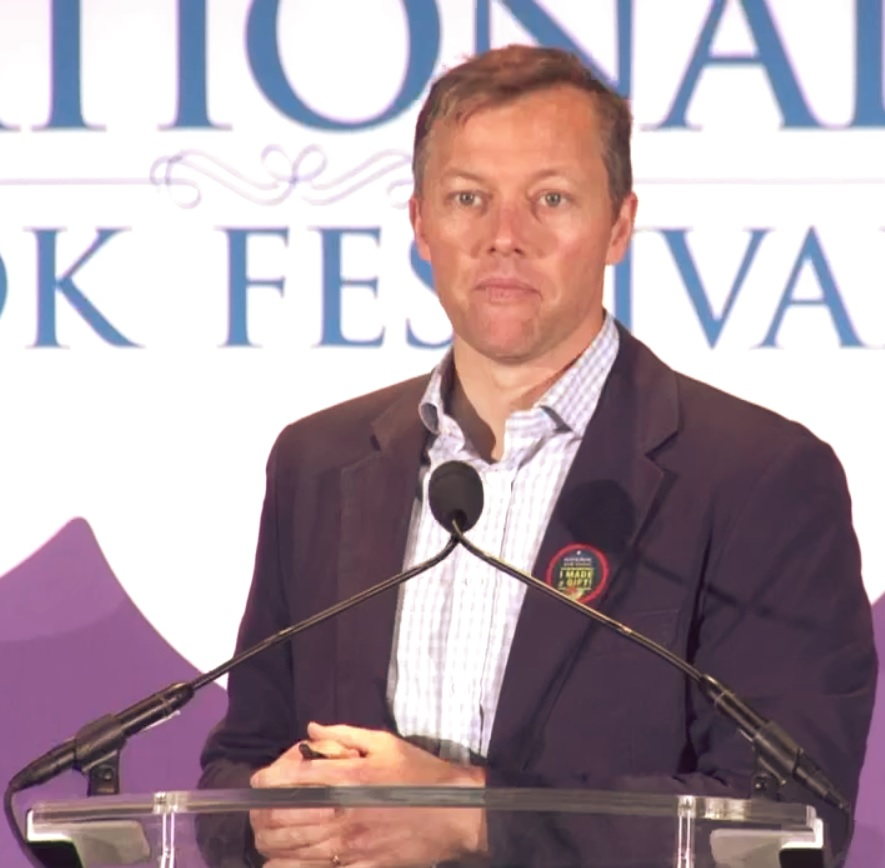
Desmond discusses the book at the 2017 National Book Festival

== Awards and honors ==
=== Awards ===
- 2018 Order of the Coif Book Award
- 2017 Pulitzer Prize for General Nonfiction
- 2017 PEN/John Kenneth Galbraith Award
- 2017 Andrew Carnegie Medal for Excellence in Nonfiction
- 2017 Hillman Prize for Book Journalism
- 2017 Chicago Tribune Heartland Prize
- 2016 National Book Critics Circle Award

=== Honors ===
- The book is listed #21 on The New York Times' 100 Best Books of the 21st Century list.
