= Matthew Desmond =

American sociologist

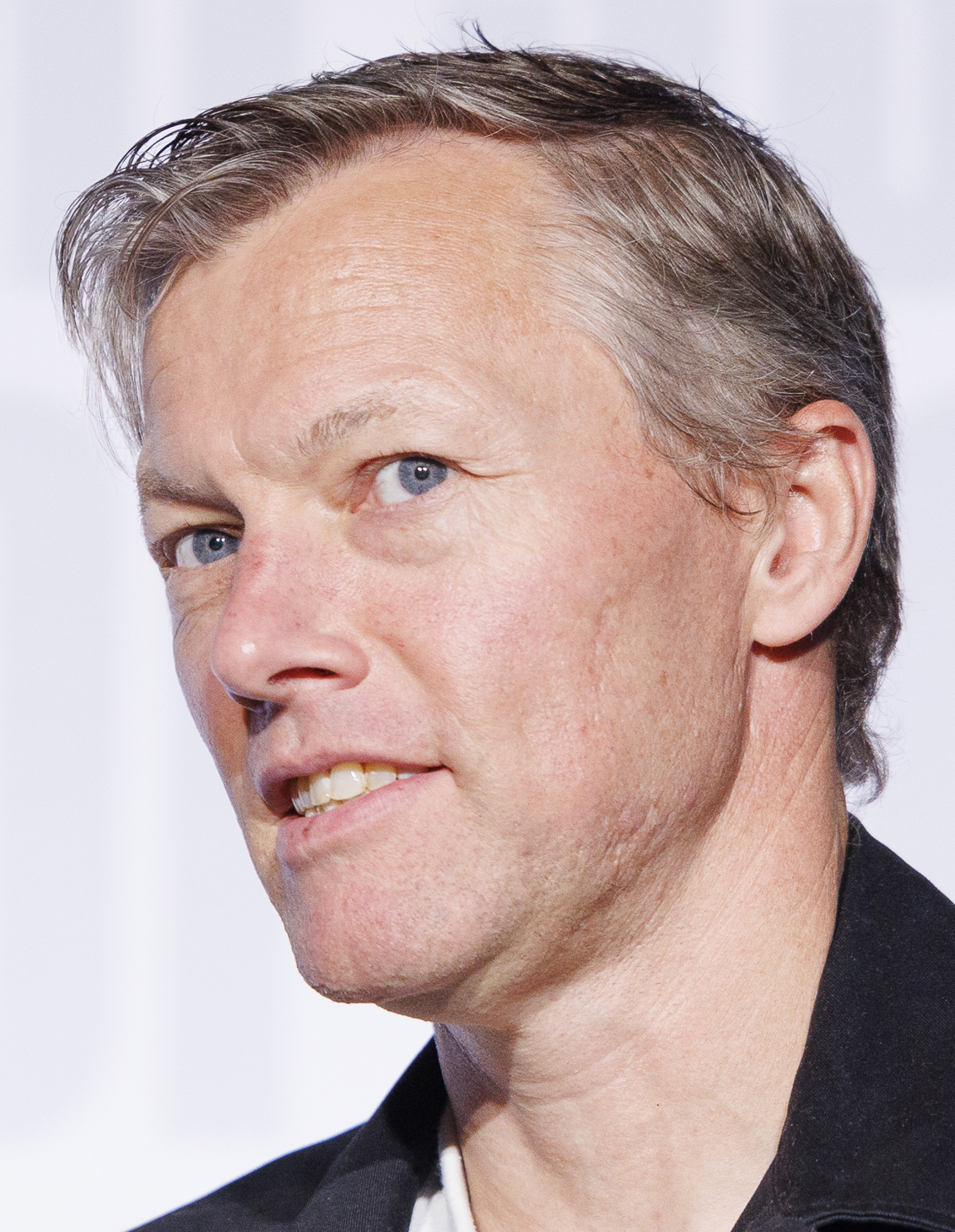
- Desmond in 2023
- Born: 1979 or 1980 (age 45–46)
- Education: Arizona State University, Tempe (BS); University of Wisconsin-Madison (MA, PhD)
- Awards: Pulitzer Prize for General Nonfiction (2017)
- Scientific career
- Fields: Sociology
- Workplaces: Princeton University
- Doctoral advisor: Mustafa Emirbayer

Matthew Desmond is an American sociologist. He is the Maurice P. During Professor of Sociology at Princeton University, where he is also the principal investigator of the Eviction Lab. Desmond was elected to the American Philosophical Society in 2022. He was formerly the John L. Loeb Associate Professor of the Social Sciences at Harvard University.

== Education ==
As an undergraduate at Arizona State University, Desmond was a volunteer with Habitat for Humanity in Tempe. In 2002, he graduated from ASU with a B.S. degree with highest honors in communications and justice studies. He received a Ph.D. in Community and Environmental Sociology (formerly known as Rural Sociology) from the University of Wisconsin–Madison in 2010.

== Honors ==
Desmond was awarded a Harvey Fellowship in 2006 and a MacArthur Fellowship in 2015. He won the 2017 Pulitzer Prize for General Nonfiction, the 2017 PEN/John Kenneth Galbraith Award, and the 2016 National Book Critics Circle Award for his work about poverty, Evicted: Poverty and Profit in the American City. His 2017 Pulitzer Prize citation read, "For a deeply researched exposé that showed how mass evictions after the 2008 economic crash were less a consequence than a cause of poverty."

== Works ==
- Desmond, Matthew (2008). On the Fireline: Living and Dying with Wildland Firefighters. University of Chicago Press. ISBN 978-0-226-14407-8.
- Emirbayer, Mustafa and Matthew Desmond (2009). Racial Domination, Racial Progress: The Sociology of Race in America. New York: McGraw-Hill. ISBN 9780072970517
- Emirbayer, Mustafa; Desmond, Matthew (2015). The Racial Order. Chicago: University of Chicago Press. ISBN 978-0-226-25366-4.
- Desmond, Matthew (2016). Evicted: Poverty and Profit in the American City. New York: Crown/Archetype, 2016. ISBN 9780553447446
- Desmond, Matthew (2018). "Why Work Doesn't Work Anymore." New York Times Magazine, p. 36, September 16, 2018.
- Desmond, Matthew (2019). "American Capitalism Is Brutal. You Can Trace That to the Plantation." New York Times Magazine, 2019 (part of The 1619 Project).
- Desmond, Matthew (2021), "Capitalism", chapter in The 1619 Project: A New Origin Story.
- Desmond, Matthew (2023). Poverty, by America. New York: Crown, 2023. ISBN 9780593239919
