= Kirkus Prize =

American literary award

- Awarded for: Fiction; Nonfiction; Young Readers' Literature
- Date: Annual
- Country: United States
- Presented by: Kirkus Reviews
- Reward: US$50,000
- First award: 2014; 12 years ago
- Website: www.kirkusreviews.com/prize/

The Kirkus Prize is an American literary award conferred by the book review magazine Kirkus Reviews. Established in 2014, the Kirkus Prize bestows US$150,000 annually. Three authors are awarded US$50,000 each, divided into three categories: Fiction, Nonfiction, and Young Readers' Literature. It has been described as one of the most lucrative prizes in literature.

== Eligibility and selection ==
Books reviewed by Kirkus Reviews that have received the Kirkus Star are automatically eligible for the Kirkus Prize and are selected for nomination. The eligibility dates of publication for books is typically between November 1 of the previous year and October 31 of the current year, with few exceptions. Self-published books that have earned the Kirkus Star are eligible for the Kirkus Prize. However, self-published books are not eligible based on their date of publication but rather the date of publication of their online review by Kirkus Reviews. All books must first be reviewed by Kirkus Reviews to be considered.

The Prize is divided into three categories: the Kirkus Prize for Fiction, the Kirkus Prize for Nonfiction and the Kirkus Prize for Young Readers' Literature. Each category is judged by a panel of three judges: a writer, a bookseller or librarian, and a Kirkus Reviews critic. The editors and staff of Kirkus Reviews evaluate each of the nominated books, conducting a first round of eliminations. The panels of judges then decide upon six finalists in each of the three categories. In the Young Readers' Literature category, the six finalists include two picture books, two middle-grade books and two teen books. The three winners are announced at a ceremony. The prize money for books with multiple authors and illustrators is divided fairly as decided by the Prize's judges and administrators.

== Winners and finalists ==
=== Fiction ===
Kirkus Prize for Fiction winners and finalists
Year	Author	Book	Result	Ref.
2014	Lily King	Euphoria	Winner	
2014	Siri Hustvedt	The Blazing World	Finalist	
2014	Dinaw Mengestu	All Our Names	Finalist	
2014	Brian Morton	Florence Gordon	Finalist	
2014	Bill Roorbach	The Remedy for Love	Finalist	
2014	Sarah Waters	The Paying Guests	Finalist	
2015	Hanya Yanagihara	A Little Life	Winner	
2015	Susan Barker	The Incarnations	Finalist	
2015	Lucia Berlin; Stephen Emerson (ed.)	A Manual for Cleaning Women	Finalist	
2015	Lauren Groff	Fates and Furies	Finalist	
2015	Valeria Luiselli; Christina MacSweeney (tr.)	The Story of My Teeth	Finalist	
2015	Jim Shepard	The Book of Aron	Finalist	
2016	C. E. Morgan	The Sport of Kings	Winner	
2016	Adam Haslett	Imagine Me Gone	Finalist	
2016	Joe McGinniss Jr.	Carousel Court	Finalist	
2016	Annie Proulx	Barkskins	Finalist	
2016	Amor Towles	A Gentleman in Moscow	Finalist	
2016	Colson Whitehead	The Underground Railroad	Finalist	
2017	Lesley Nneka Arimah	What It Means When a Man Falls from the Sky	Winner	
2017	Mohsin Hamid	Exit West	Finalist	
2017	Hari Kunzru	White Tears	Finalist	
2017	Carmen Maria Machado	Her Body and Other Parties	Finalist	
2017	Alice McDermott	The Ninth Hour	Finalist	
2017	Jesmyn Ward	Sing, Unburied, Sing	Finalist	
2018	Ling Ma	Severance	Winner	
2018	Naima Coster	Halsey Street	Finalist	
2018	Lauren Groff	Florida	Finalist	
2018	Eduardo Halfon; Lisa Dillman (tr.); Daniel Hahn (tr.)	Mourning	Finalist	
2018	Nafissa Thompson-Spires	Heads of the Colored People	Finalist	
2018	Katie Williams	Tell the Machine Goodnight	Finalist	
2019	Colson Whitehead	The Nickel Boys	Winner	
2019	Carolina De Robertis	Cantoras	Finalist	
2019	Laila Lalami	The Other Americans	Finalist	
2019	Valeria Luiselli	Lost Children Archive	Finalist	
2019	Yūko Tsushima; Geraldine Harcourt (tr.)	Territory of Light	Finalist	
2019	Ocean Vuong	On Earth We're Briefly Gorgeous	Finalist	
2020	Raven Leilani	Luster	Winner	
2020	Tola Rotimi Abraham	Black Sunday	Finalist	
2020	Juliana Delgado Lopera	Fiebre Tropical	Finalist	
2020	Elena Ferrante; Ann Goldstein (tr.)	The Lying Life of Adults	Finalist	
2020	James McBride	Deacon King Kong	Finalist	
2020	Douglas Stuart	Shuggie Bain	Finalist	
2021	Joy Williams	Harrow	Winner	
2021	Mariana Enríquez; Megan McDowell (tr.)	The Dangers of Smoking in Bed	Finalist	
2021	Honorée Fanonne Jeffers	The Love Songs of W.E.B. Du Bois	Finalist	
2021	Jocelyn Nicole Johnson	My Monticello	Finalist	
2021	Pajtim Statovci; David Hackston (tr.)	Bolla	Finalist	
2021	Colson Whitehead	Harlem Shuffle	Finalist	
2022	Hernan Diaz	Trust	Winner	
2022	Michelle de Kretser	Scary Monsters	Finalist	
2022	Arinze Ifeakandu	God's Children Are Little Broken Things	Finalist	
2022	Susan Straight	Mecca	Finalist	
2022	Yoko Tawada; Margaret Mitsutani (tr.)	Scattered All Over the Earth	Finalist	
2022	Olga Tokarczuk; Jennifer Croft (tr.)	The Books of Jacob	Finalist	
2023	James McBride	The Heaven & Earth Grocery Store	Winner	
2023	Jamel Brinkley	Witness	Finalist	
2023	Eleanor Catton	Birnam Wood	Finalist	
2023	Kelly Link	White Cat, Black Dog	Finalist	
2023	Paul Murray	The Bee Sting	Finalist	
2023	Jesmyn Ward	Let Us Descend	Finalist	
2024	Percival Everett	James	Winner	
2024	Jennine Capó Crucet	Say Hello to My Little Friend	Finalist	
2024	Louise Erdrich	The Mighty Red	Finalist	
2024	Paul Lynch	Prophet Song	Finalist	
2024	Richard Powers	Playground	Finalist	
2024	Rufi Thorpe	Margo's Got Money Troubles	Finalist	
2025	Lucas Schaefer	The Slip	Winner	
2025	Kiran Desai	The Loneliness of Sonia and Sunny	Finalist	
2025	Angela Flournoy	The Wilderness	Finalist	
2025	Allegra Goodman	Isola	Finalist	
2025	Megha Majumdar	A Guardian and a Thief	Finalist	
2025	David Szalay	Flesh	Finalist	
2026	Tayari Jones	Kin	Winner	
2026	Daniyal Mueenuddin	This Is Where the Serpent Lives	Finalist	
2026	Brenda Navarro Megan McDowell (tr.)	Eating Ashes	Finalist	
2026	Julie Orringer	Luna, Phoenix, Queen	Finalist	
2026	Douglas Stuart	John of John	Finalist	
2026	Colson Whitehead	Cool Machine	Finalist	

=== Nonfiction ===
Kirkus Prize for Nonfiction winners and finalists
Year	Author	Book	Result	Ref.
2014	Roz Chast	Can't We Talk About Something More Pleasant?	Winner	
2014	Leo Damrosch	Jonathan Swift: His Life and His World	Finalist	
2014	Elizabeth Kolbert	The Sixth Extinction: An Unnatural History	Finalist	
2014	Armand Marie Leroi	The Lagoon: How Aristotle Invented Science	Finalist	
2014	Thomas Piketty; Arthur Goldhammer (tr.)	Capital in the Twenty-First Century	Finalist	
2014	Bryan Stevenson	Just Mercy: A Story of Justice and Redemption	Finalist	
2015	Ta-Nehisi Coates	Between the World and Me	Winner	
2015	John Ferling	Whirlwind: The American Revolution and the War That Won It	Finalist	
2015	Helen Macdonald	H is for Hawk	Finalist	
2015	Adam Tooze	The Deluge: The Great War, America and the Remaking of the Global Order, 1916–1931	Finalist	
2015	Simon Winchester	Pacific: Silicon Chips and Surfboards, Coral Reefs and Atom Bombs, Brutal Dictators, Fading Empires, and the Coming Collision of the World's Superpowers	Finalist	
2015	Andrea Wulf	The Invention of Nature: Alexander von Humboldt's New World	Finalist	
2016	Susan Faludi	In the Darkroom	Winner	
2016	Sarah Bakewell	At the Existentialist Café: Freedom, Being, and Apricot Cocktails	Finalist	
2016	Matthew Desmond	Evicted: Poverty and Profit in the American City	Finalist	
2016	Michael Eric Dyson	The Black Presidency: Barack Obama and the Politics of Race in America	Finalist	
2016	Beth Macy	Truevine: Two Brothers, a Kidnapping, and a Mother's Quest: A True Story of the Jim Crow South	Finalist	
2016	JD Vance	Hillbilly Elegy: A Memoir of a Family and Culture in Crisis	Finalist	
2017	Jack E. Davis	The Gulf: The Making of an American Sea	Winner	
2017	Edward Dolnick	The Seeds of Life: From Aristotle to da Vinci, from Sharks' Teeth to Frogs' Pants, the Long and Strange Quest to Discover Where Babies Come	Finalist	
2017	Patricia Lockwood	Priestdaddy: A Memoir	Finalist	
2017	Valeria Luiselli; Lizzie Davis (tr.)	Tell Me How It Ends: An Essay in Forty Questions	Finalist	
2017	Michael W. Twitty	The Cooking Gene: A Journey Through African American Culinary History in the Old South	Finalist	
2017	Laura Walls	Henry David Thoreau: A Life	Finalist	
2018	Rebecca Solnit	Call Them by Their True Names: American Crises (and Essays)	Winner	
2018	Shane Bauer	American Prison: A Reporter's Undercover Journey into the Business of Punishment	Finalist	
2018	Kiese Laymon	Heavy: An American Memoir	Finalist	
2018	Beth Macy	Dopesick: Dealers, Doctors, and the Drug Company That Addicted America	Finalist	
2018	Sarah Smarsh	Heartland: A Memoir of Working Hard and Being Broke in the Richest Country on Earth	Finalist	
2018	Timothy Snyder	The Road to Unfreedom: Russia, Europe, America	Finalist	
2019	Saeed Jones	How We Fight for Our Lives: A Memoir	Winner	
2019	Hanif Abdurraqib	Go Ahead in the Rain: Notes to A Tribe Called Quest	Finalist	
2019	Naja Marie Aidt; Denise Newman (tr.)	When Death Takes Something from You Give It Back: Carl's Book	Finalist	
2019	Patrick Radden Keefe	Say Nothing: A True Story of Murder and Memory in Northern Ireland	Finalist	
2019	Dina Nayeri	The Ungrateful Refugee: What Immigrants Never Tell You	Finalist	
2019	Rachel Louise Snyder	No Visible Bruises: What We Don't Know About Domestic Violence Can Kill Us	Finalist	
2020	Mychal Denzel Smith	Stakes Is High: Life After the American Dream	Winner	
2020	Eric Jay Dolin	A Furious Sky: The Five-Hundred-Year History of America's Hurricanes	Finalist	
2020	Rebecca Giggs	Fathoms: The World in the Whale	Finalist	
2020	Deirdre Mask	The Address Book: What Street Addresses Reveal About Identity, Race, Wealth, and Power	Finalist	
2020	Aimee Nezhukumatathil; Fumi Nakamura (ill.)	World of Wonders: In Praise of Fireflies, Whale Sharks, and Other Astonishments	Finalist	
2020	Isabel Wilkerson	Caste: The Origins of Our Discontents	Finalist	
2021	Brian Broome	Punch Me Up to the Gods: A Memoir	Winner	
2021	Dara Horn	People Love Dead Jews: Reports From a Haunted Present	Finalist	
2021	Tiya Miles	All That She Carried: The Journey of Ashley's Sack, a Black Family Keepsake	Finalist	
2021	Kristen Radtke	Seek You: A Journey Through American Loneliness	Finalist	
2021	Katherine E. Standefer	Lightning Flowers: My Journey to Uncover the Cost of Saving a Life	Finalist	
2021	Juan Villoro; Alfred MacAdam (tr.)	Horizontal Vertigo: A City Called Mexico	Finalist	
2022	Tanaïs	In Sensorium	Winner	
2022	Margaret A. Burnham	By Hands Now Known	Finalist	
2022	Lindsey Fitzharris	The Facemaker	Finalist	
2022	Nikole Hannah-Jones; Caitlin Roper (ed.); Ilena Silverman (ed.); Jake Silverstein (ed.)	The 1619 Project	Finalist	
2022	Ann Patchett	These Precious Days	Finalist	
2022	Ed Yong	An Immense World	Finalist	
2023	Héctor Tobar	Our Migrant Souls: A Meditation on the Meanings and Myths of "Latino"	Winner	
2023	Tania Branigan	Red Memory: The Afterlives of China's Cultural Revolution	Finalist	
2023	Jennifer Homans	Mr. B: George Balanchine's 20th Century	Finalist	
2023	Clancy Martin	How Not to Kill Yourself: A Portrait of the Suicidal Mind	Finalist	
2023	Safiya Sinclair	How to Say Babylon: A Memoir	Finalist	
2023	Ilyon Woo	Master Slave Husband Wife: An Epic Journey From Slavery to Freedom	Finalist	
2024	Adam Higginbotham	Challenger: A True Story of Heroism and Disaster on the Edge of Space	Winner	
2024	Steve Coll	The Achilles Trap: Saddam Hussein, the CIA, and the Origins of America's Invasion of Iraq	Finalist	
2024	Tessa Hulls	Feeding Ghosts: A Graphic Memoir	Finalist	
2024	Olivia Laing	The Garden Against Time: In Search of a Common Paradise	Finalist	
2024	Shefali Luthra	Undue Burden: Life and Death Decisions in Post-Roe America	Finalist	
2024	Carvell Wallace	Another Word for Love: A Memoir	Finalist	
2025	Scott Anderson	King of Kings: The Iranian Revolution: A Story of Hubris, Delusion and Catastrophic Miscalculation	Winner	
2025	Nicholas Boggs	Baldwin: A Love Story	Finalist	
2025	Sophie Elmhirst	A Marriage at Sea: A True Story of Love, Obsession, and Shipwreck	Finalist	
2025	Greg Grandin	America, América: A New History of the New World	Finalist	
2025	Imani Perry	Black in Blues: How a Color Tells the Story of My People	Finalist	
2025	Arundhati Roy	Mother Mary Comes to Me	Finalist	
2026	Pamela Colloff	Catch the Devil: A True Story of Murder, Deception, and Injustice on the Gulf Coast	Winner	
2026	Ada Ferrer	Keeper of My Kin: Memoir of an Immigrant Daughter	Finalist	
2026	Patrick Radden Keefe	London Falling: A Mysterious Death in a Gilded City and a Family's Search for Truth	Finalist	
2026	Loubna Mrie	Defiance: A Memoir of Awakening, Rebellion, and Survival in Syria	Finalist	
2026	Gisèle Pelicot, with Judith Perrignon Natasha Lehrer (tr.) Ruth Diver (tr.)	A Hymn to Life: Shame Has To Change Sides	Finalist	
2026	Michael Pollan	A World Appears: A Journey Into Consciousness	Finalist	

=== Young Readers' Literature ===
Kirkus Prize for Young Readers' Literature winners and finalists
Year	Author	Book	Result	Ref.
2014	Kate Samworth	Aviary Wonders Inc.: Spring Catalog and Instruction Manual	Winner	
2014	Cece Bell	El Deafo	Finalist	
2014	Jen Bryant; Melissa Sweet (ill.)	The Right Word: Roget and His Thesaurus	Finalist	
2014	Jack Gantos	The Key That Swallowed Joey Pigza	Finalist	
2014	E. K. Johnston	The Story of Owen: Dragon Slayer of Trondheim	Finalist	
2014	Don Mitchell	The Freedom Summer Murders	Finalist	
2015	Pam Muñoz Ryan; Dinara Mirtalipova (ill.)	Echo	Winner	
2015	Martha Brockenbrough	The Game of Love and Death	Finalist	
2015	Lauren Child	The New Small Person	Finalist	
2015	Daniel José Older	Shadowshaper	Finalist	
2015	Duncan Tonatiuh	Funny Bones: Posada and His Day of the Dead Calaveras	Finalist	
2015	Jonah Winter; Shane W. Evans (ill.)	Lillian's Right to Vote: A Celebration of the Voting Rights Act of 1965	Finalist	
2016	Jason Reynolds	As Brave as You	Winner	
2016	Sherman Alexie; Yuyi Morales (ill.)	Thunder Boy Jr.	Finalist	
2016	Ashley Bryan	Freedom Over Me: Eleven Slaves, Their Lives and Dreams Brought to Life by Ashley Bryan	Finalist	
2016	Traci Chee	The Reader	Finalist	
2016	Russell Freedman	We Will Not Be Silent: The White Rose Student Resistance Movement That Defied Adolf Hitler	Finalist	
2016	Meg Medina	Burn Baby Burn	Finalist	
2017	Cherie Dimaline	The Marrow Thieves	Winner	
2017	Jairo Buitrago; Rafael Yockteng (ill.); Elisa Amado (tr.)	Walk with Me	Finalist	
2017	Cao Wenxuan; Helen Wang (tr.); Meilo So (ill.)	Bronze and Sunflower	Finalist	
2017	Karen English	It All Comes Down to This	Finalist	
2017	Lilli L'Arronge; Madeleine Stratford (tr.)	Me Tall, You Small	Finalist	
2017	Angie Thomas	The Hate U Give	Finalist	
2018	Derrick Barnes; Gordon C. James (ill.)	Crown: An Ode to the Fresh Cut	Winner	
2018	Elizabeth Acevedo	The Poet X	Finalist	
2018	Tomi Adeyemi	Children of Blood and Bone	Finalist	
2018	Meg Medina	Merci Suárez Changes Gears	Finalist	
2018	Yuyi Morales	Dreamers	Finalist	
2018	Jacqueline Woodson	Harbor Me	Finalist	
2019	Jerry Craft; Jim Callahan (color.)	New Kid	Winner	
2019	Kwame Alexander; Kadir Nelson (ill.)	The Undefeated	Finalist	
2019	Juan Felipe Herrera; Lauren Castillo (ill.)	Imagine	Finalist	
2019	Angie Thomas	On the Come Up	Finalist	
2019	Juan Pablo Villalobos; Rosalind Harvey (tr.)	The Other Side: Stories of Central American Teen Refugees Who Dream of Crossing the Border	Finalist	
2019	Alicia D. Williams	Genesis Begins Again	Finalist	
2020	Derrick Barnes; Gordon C. James (ill.)	I Am Every Good Thing	Winner	
2020	Elizabeth Acevedo	Clap When You Land	Finalist	
2020	Hanna Alkaf	The Girl and the Ghost	Finalist	
2020	Kimberly Brubaker Bradley	Fighting Words	Finalist	
2020	Carole Lindstrom; Michaela Goade (ill.)	We Are Water Protectors	Finalist	
2020	Ibram X. Kendi and Jason Reynolds	Stamped: Racism, Antiracism, and You	Finalist	
2021	Christina Soontornvat	All Thirteen: The Incredible Cave Rescue of the Thai Boys' Soccer Team	Winner	
2021	Sharon G. Flake	The Life I'm In	Finalist	
2021	Nikki Grimes	Legacy: Women Poets of the Harlem Renaissance	Finalist	
2021	NoNieqa Ramos; Jacqueline Alcántara (ill.)	Your Mama	Finalist	
2021	Wai Chim	The Surprising Power of a Good Dumpling	Finalist	
2021	Carole Boston Weatherford; Floyd Cooper (ill.)	Unspeakable: The Tulsa Race Massacre	Finalist	
2022	Harmony Becker	Himawari House	Winner	
2022	Betina Birkjær; Anna Margrethe Kjærgaard (ill.); Sinéad Quirke Køngerskov (tr.)	Coffee, Rabbit, Snowdrop, Lost	Finalist	
2022	Rimma Onoseta	How You Grow Wings	Finalist	
2022	Niki Smith	The Golden Hour	Finalist	
2022	Anne Ursu	The Troubled Girls of Dragomir Academy	Finalist	
2022	Jacqueline Woodson; Rafael López (ill.)	The Year We Learned to Fly	Finalist	
2023	Ariel Aberg-Riger	America Redux: Visual Stories from Our Dynamic History	Winner	
2023	Valerie Bolling; Kaylani Juanita (ill.)	Together We Swim	Finalist	
2023	Louise Finch	The Eternal Return of Clara Hart	Finalist	
2023	Kiran Millwood Hargrave; Tom de Freston (ill.)	Julia and the Shark	Finalist	
2023	Jon Klassen	The Skull: A Tyrolean Folktale	Finalist	
2023	Roger Mello; Daniel Hahn (trans.)	João by a Thread	Finalist	
2024	Kenneth M. Cadow	Gather	Winner	
2024	Safia Elhillo	Bright Red Fruit	Finalist	
2024	Joanna Ho; Amanda Phingbodhipakkiya (ill.)	We Who Produce Pearls	Finalist	
2024	Hiba Noor Khan	Safiyyah's War	Finalist	
2024	Jason Reynolds; Jerome Pumphrey (ill.); Jarrett Pumphrey (ill.)	There Was a Party for Langston	Finalist	
2024	Sherri Winston	Shark Teeth	Finalist	
2025	Thao Lam	Everybelly	Winner	
2025	Derrick Barnes	The Incredibly Human Henson Blayze	Finalist	
2025	Triinu Laan; Marja-Liisa Plats (ill.); Adam Cullen (tr.)	John the Skeleton	Finalist	
2025	Moa Backe Åstot; Agnes Broomé (tr.)	Butterfly Heart	Finalist	
2025	Candace Fleming	Death in the Jungle: Murder, Betrayal and the Lost Dream of Jonestown	Finalist	
2025	Brian Floca; Sydney Smith (ill.)	Island Storm	Finalist	
2026	Elizabeth Acevedo	Anger Is Only a Shadow	Winner	
2026	Julie Leung Angie Kang (ill.)	Navigating Night	Finalist	
2026	Karthika Naïr Joëlle Jolivet (ill.)	Electric Birds of Pothakudi	Finalist	
2026	Matthew Fox	The Lovely Dark	Finalist	
2026	Daniel Nayeri	This Is a Door	Finalist	
2026	Blessing Musariri	When It's Your Turn for Midnight	Finalist	

== See also ==
- List of American literary awards
