= SmokeLong Quarterly =

American literary magazine

SmokeLong Quarterly is an American literary magazine dedicated to flash fiction. Founded in 2003 by Dave Clapper, the quarterly is currently based in Nolensville, Tennessee, and edited by Christopher Allen. The magazine has been described by Electric Literature as "one of the top literary journals that specialize in flash fiction" and by the International Writers' Collective as "one of the best places to submit flash fiction."

== History ==
SmokeLong Quarterly was established in 2003, making it one of the earliest online literary magazines devoted exclusively to flash fiction. The magazine's name derives from a Chinese anecdote noting that reading a piece of flash fiction takes approximately the same length of time as smoking a cigarette.

Past editors-in-chief include Randall Brown (2008–2012), Tara Laskowski (2010–2019), and Beth Thomas. Laskowski, who edited the magazine for nine years, is a novelist who received the Agatha, Macavity, and Anthony Awards. George Mason University's English Department recognized Laskowski's work at SmokeLong as placing the magazine "at the vanguard of the flash fiction world," noting that the magazine's "impact can be felt in the wider literary universe."

In 2020, Christopher Allen assumed the role of editor-in-chief and publisher. Allen's work has been anthologized in Flash Fiction America (Norton, 2023) and selected for Best Small Fictions 2019 (Sonder Press), and he has served as a judge for the Bridport Prize.

In 2014, SmokeLong published an anthology of work from its first decade, SmokeLong Quarterly: The Best of the First Ten Years, 2003-2013, edited by Laskowski and released through Matter Press.

== Editorial approach and reception ==
The magazine publishes flash fiction and nonfiction narratives of 1,000 words or fewer, accepting general submissions year-round and paying writers between $100–150 per piece. Writer's Digest featured SmokeLong as one of five notable flash fiction and nonfiction markets in 2023.

The editors of SmokeLong Quarterly, an international team, read submissions anonymously. According to the journal's guidelines, "We believe that the unpublished, unknown writer should have equal footing with the established writer."

SmokeLong Quarterly senior editor Sherrie Flick co-edited W.W. Norton's Flash Fiction America (2023). Flick also served as series editor for Best Small Fictions 2018 (Braddock Avenue Books).

The Paris Review cited SmokeLong Quarterly (alongside Wigleaf) as an example of an online journal that contributed to the emerging popularity of flash fiction in a 2018 article titled "The Godmother of Flash Fiction." In a 2019 interview with BOMB Magazine for an article reflecting on "the Past Decade in Literature," the writer Rion Amilcar Scott mentioned SmokeLong as an online flash fiction venue which "allowed [him] to figure out how to write as [him]self" as he began exploring the genre. Lyndsie Manusos of Book Riot wrote in a 2019 article that "SmokeLong has and continues to publish exceptional flash fiction."

The editorial team has also collaborated with editors of other literary journals, including The Cincinnati Review.

== Notable contributors ==
Contributors to SmokeLong Quarterly have included award-winning and nationally recognized writers:

- Venita Blackburn, whose debut collection Black Jesus and Other Superheroes (2017) won the Prairie Schooner Book Prize and was a finalist for the PEN/Bingham Award.
- Raven Leilani, whose story "Airplane Mode" appeared in SmokeLong prior to her debut novel Luster (2020) winning the Kirkus Prize
- K-Ming Chang, a Lambda Literary Award winner and National Book Foundation 5 Under 35 honoree
- Dan Chaon, a National Book Award finalist
- Tod Goldberg
- Stuart Dybek, recipient of a Lannan Prize, Whiting Award, and O. Henry Award
- Vi Khi Nao
- Alison Stine
- A. J. Bermudez
- Katharine Weber
- Aimee Bender
- John Dufresne

== Anthology appearances and recognition ==
Works first published in SmokeLong Quarterly regularly appear in major literary anthologies. Several stories have been selected for W.W. Norton's flash fiction anthology series, including five stories in Flash Fiction International (2015) and twelve stories in Flash Fiction America (2023). W.W. Norton hosted a special reading event in 2023 featuring eleven SmokeLong authors whose work appeared in Flash Fiction America. Ploughshares described the Norton flash fiction series as "well-used and well-loved by fiction instructors and have introduced a generation of readers to the genre of flash fiction and its foremost players."

SmokeLong stories have appeared in Best of the Net, Best Small Fictions, Best Microfiction, and the Wigleaf Top 50. Ploughshares featured Liza Olson's "Brought to Shore," published by SmokeLong Quarterly in 2015, in their "The Best Short Story I Read in a Lit Mag This Week" blog series.

== The SmokeLong Quarterly Award for Flash Fiction ==
The magazine hosts an annual competition, The SmokeLong Quarterly Award for Flash Fiction (also known as The Smokey), with a grand prize of $2,500. Many winning stories have since appeared in "best of" anthologies, including the 2018 winner, Alvin Park's "Whale Fall," and the 2020 winner, Abby Feden's "To Pieces," which both appeared in Best Small Fictions. Finalist Jasmine Sawers' 2020 piece "All Your Fragile History" was both a finalist for Best of the Net and included in Flash Fiction America, while third-place finisher Leonora Desar's "*69" was included in Best Small Fictions. 2025 runner-up Chi Pham's "Man Spelt Backwards" was included in MONARCH 2026 (fifth wheel press, 2026), an awards anthology of queer writing.

Year	Recipient	Runner-Up	Third Place
2026	L.A. Strycker, "On Trees and Treefrogs"	Ellen Garard, "Fruit of Our Body"	Kate Catinella, "Small Something"
2025	Mizuki Yamamoto, “Between Chamisa and Rengyō”	Chi Pham, "Man Spelt Backwards"	Valerie Fox, "Special Occasion Italian Restaurant"
2024	Shayla Frandsen, “Grocery Store Mama”	Latifa Ayad, "Octopus Heart"	Stephanie Yu, "Strong Female Character Goes by Her Last Name Only"
2022	Marcus Tan, “Emergency Contact”	Oyinkansola Sofela, “Remembrance”	Scott Pomfret, “What We Always Carry With US”
2020	Abby Feden, “To Pieces”	Jasmine Sawers, “All Your Fragile History”	Leonora Desar, “*69”
2018	Alvin Park, “Whale Fall”	Devin Kelly, "All the Other Dogs Screaming"	Elaine Edwards, "Satellite"

Other stories recognized by the competition have subsequently been featured in other magazines and competitions. Works first appearing in SmokeLong Quarterly's competition issues have been positively received by Literary Hub's CrimeReads, WILDNESS, Heavy Feather Review, and The New Territory, and included in recommended reading lists by The Cincinnati Review and the Community of Literary Magazines and Presses. Awardees have also been recognized by the New Millennium Writings Award and Wigleaf Top 50.

The magazine also runs The SmokeLong Grand Micro Contest (The Mikey) with a $1,000 grand prize and The SmokeLong Workshop Prize
