= John Englehardt =

American fiction writer (born 1987)

John Lewis Englehardt III
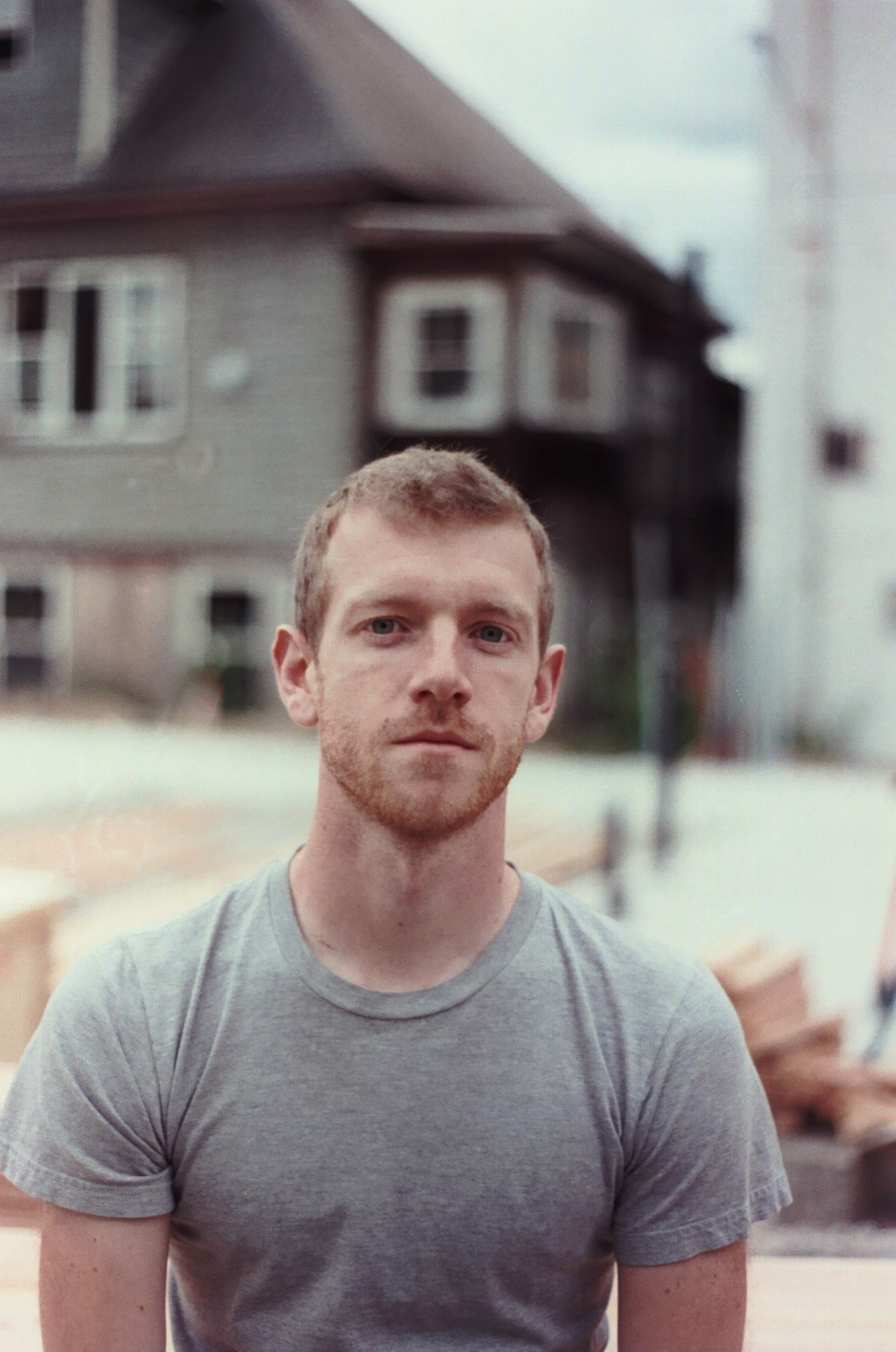
- Englehardt in 2015
- Born: May 23, 1987 (age 39); Fort Hood, Texas
- Education: Seattle University, University of Arkansas
- Occupations: Writer, educator, novelist
- Spouse: Kato Toombs (m. 2017)
- Website: johnenglehardt.com

John Lewis Englehardt III (born May 23, 1987) is an American author and educator. He is best known for his 2019 debut novel, Bloomland, which examines the aftermath of a university mass shooting from multiple perspectives.

== Life and career ==
Englehardt earned a BA in creative writing from Seattle University and a MFA from the University of Arkansas. Englehardt taught English composition and creative writing classes at the University of Arkansas while completing his MFA. After completing his MFA, Englehardt worked as a contributing editor at Pacifica Literary Review, and was selected as a 2015 Made at Hugo House Fellow.

His debut novel Bloomland was published by Dzanc Books in 2019. His writing has appeared in Sycamore Review, The Stranger, Vol. 1 Brooklyn, Monkeybicycle, and The Seattle Review of Books, among other publications. An avid skateboarder, he was interviewed by Skateism Magazine in 2019. Englehardt currently teaches writing classes at Hugo House, a Seattle-based non-profit writing center. In 2021 Englehardt held a Professorship of English at Pacific Lutheran University.

== Critical reception ==
Kirkus Reviews describes Bloomland as "Hugely important, hauntingly brutal" and states, "Englehardt has just announced himself as one of America’s most talented emerging writers." Kristen Millares Young of The Washington Post writes, "“Bloomland” juxtaposes the proximate with the predator, intermingling their perspectives until the flickering becomes a bloody tapestry of our beleaguered nation." In The Literary Review, Jeff Bursey states, "writing a relatively non-polemical debut novel about a student who shoots others at his campus would be difficult to do, but John Englehardt, in Bloomland, has achieved this feat." Publishers Weekly describes the novel as "potent" and states, "Englehardt’s debut poses timely, difficult questions."

== Honors and awards ==
- 2012 A&P Winter Fiction Contest, The Stranger
- 2014 Wabash Prize for Fiction, Sycamore Review
- 2018 Dzanc Books Prize for Fiction
- 2020 VCU Cabell First Novelist Award

== Works ==
=== Novel ===
- Bloomland (2019)

=== Short fiction ===
- Englehardt, John. (Dec. 5, 2012). "Gingrich". The Stranger
- Englehardt, John. (Dec. 16, 2013). "Kentbrook! Kentbrook! Kentbrook!" Monkey Bicycle
- Englehardt, John. (Jul. 8, 2018) "From the Void I Saw Your Face" Vol. 1 Brooklyn

== Personal life ==
Englehardt married his partner, Kato Toombs, in March 2017. He currently resides in New York City.
