= The Wilderness (Flournoy novel) =

2025 novel by Angela Flournoy

- First edition cover
- Author: Angela Flournoy
- Genre: Literary fiction
- Publisher: Mariner Books
- Publication date: September 16, 2025
- Pages: 304
- ISBN: 978-0-063-31877-9

The Wilderness is a 2025 novel by Angela Flournoy. It received positive reception from critics upon release. The novel was listed as one of "The 10 best books of 2025" by The Washington Post.

== Plot ==
The novel follows five Black women (Desiree, Danielle, January, Monique, and Nakia) over a period of twenty years. The women face a variety of challenges to their friendships and relationships as they navigate life as Black women in America.

== Publication history ==
The Wilderness was published on September 16, 2025, by Mariner Books.

== Reception ==
In a starred review, Kirkus Reviews described the book as "elegant and upsetting," noting that the structure of the novel made it read like a collection of short stories. Publishers Weekly, also in a starred review, called the book "a knockout" and complimented Flournoy's character work. Library Journal also published a positive starred review, while Booklist praised Flournoy's prose.

The Washington Post was positive, writing that the novel's characters were realistic and that Flournoy's choice of using a first-person narrative helped immerse the reader in their minds. The New York Times positively compared the novel to Flournoy's debut, The Turner House. A review in The Boston Globe complimented the book's structure and themes. Furthermore, The New Republic wrote that the book had "broken with" the tropes found in previous novels about female friendship to great effect.

The Wilderness was longlisted for the 2025 National Book Award for Fiction, and placed on NPR's Books We Love 2025 guide. It was a finalist for the 2025 National Book Critics Circle Award for Fiction and the 2025 Kirkus Prize for Fiction. The novel was longlisted for the 2026 Aspen Words Literary Prize.
