= Raven Leilani =

American writer (born 1990)

- Born: August 26, 1990 (age 36)
- Education: Marist College (BA); New York University (MFA)
- Occupation: Writer
- Writing career
- Pen name: Raven Leilani
- Notable work: Luster
- Notable awards: 5 Under 35 Honoree (2020); John Leonard Prize (2020); Kirkus Prize (2020)

Raven Leilani Baptiste (born August 26, 1990) is an American writer who publishes under the name Raven Leilani. Her debut novel, Luster, was released in 2020 to critical acclaim. In 2020, Leilani was named a "5 Under 35" Honoree by the National Book Foundation.

== Early life and education ==
Leilani grew up in a family of artists in the Bronx. She grew up as a Seventh-day Adventist, and later left the church. Leilani studied painting in high school and during her freshman year of college, but decided to major in English and Psychology. She received her bachelor's degree from Marist College in Poughkeepsie, New York.

Before publishing her novels, she worked for Ancestry.com, a scientific journal in Washington, D.C., and as a delivery person for Postmates. She also worked at Macmillan. In 2017, she began pursuing her MFA at New York University, where she studied under Zadie Smith and Katie Kitamura. She now lives in Brooklyn and teaches at New York University. She has previously taught creative writing at Harvard University.

== Career ==
Leilani's debut novel Luster received significant attention at its publishing. The book's publisher, Farrar, Straus and Giroux named the book its novel of August 2020 as part of their "Dare to Imagine" campaign. It is also part of Marie Claire's book club and has been lauded by outlets including Elle, the HuffPost, BuzzFeed News, and The New York Times. It has been praised by authors Carmen Maria Machado, Brit Bennett, Angela Flournoy, and Zadie Smith.

Luster was awarded the 2020 Kirkus Prize for Fiction. Luster also received the 2020 Center for Fiction First Novel Prize, the 2020 John Leonard Prize at the National Book Critics Circle Awards, the 2021 Dylan Thomas Prize, and the 2021 VCU Cabell First Novelist Award.

She has written for various publications, including Esquire, The Cut, and Vogue. Her writing is influenced by her background as a visual artist, her life experiences, poetry, and a love of comic books and music.

Leilani was the 2025-2026 Rona Jaffe Foundation Fellow at the Dorothy and Lewis B. Cullman Center for Scholars and Writers at the New York Public Library.

In 2026, Farrar, Straus and Giroux acquired the North American rights to Leilani's sophomore novel, Material.

== Works ==
=== Novels ===
- Luster. New York: Farrar, Straus and Giroux. 2020. ISBN 978-0374194321. OCLC 1119744688.

=== Short stories ===
- "Hard Water" (2016), Cosmonauts Avenue
- "Breathing Exercise" (2019), Yale Review
- "Airplane Mode" (2019). SmokeLong Quarterly
