= Stiffed =

Stiffed may refer to:

- Stiffed (band), an American punk rock band
- Stiffed: The Betrayal of the American Man, a 1999 book about late-20th-century American masculinity by Susan Faludi
