= Heart the Lover =

2025 novel by Lily King

- Author: Lily King
- Language: English
- Series: Casey Peabody
- Genre: Romance
- Publisher: Grove Press
- Publication date: October 7, 2025
- Pages: 256
- ISBN: 978-0-802-16517-6
- Preceded by: Writers & Lovers

Heart the Lover is a 2025 novel by Lily King. The novel, King's seventh, follows a campus love triangle that reignites years after the participants’ graduation. Heart the Lover is the second novel following Lily King's Writers & Lovers, although it can be read as a stand-alone book.

Jordan, a professional novelist, reminiscences on a college-era romantic entanglement with Sam and Yash. After being out of contact for years, the three are reunited as a result of a crisis. The novel touches on themes of intimacy, commitment, grief, and motherhood.

== Synopsis ==
=== Part one ===
The first part takes place in the 1980s. The unnamed narrator meets two boys in her 17th-century literature class, Sam and Yash. She goes on a date with Sam and they nickname her "Jordan." Sam is religious, and Jordan is not, resulting in a tumultuous breakup after some months. Jordan and Yash both stay at college for an extra semester, and at that time they begin a relationship.

After graduation, Jordan becomes an au pair in Paris. Yash stays in America and writes letters to her sometimes. He visits her after having saved up some money, and they decide to move in together to an apartment in New York City the next year. Later, when Jordan comes to New York to meet Yash, he never shows up, instead having decided to move to Atlanta. Unbeknownst to him, Jordan is pregnant.

=== Part two ===
Years later, Jordan is married to Silas and has two young boys. Yash is visiting her family and gets along well with her children. A woman at the park mistakes Yash for their father, and Jordan quickly corrects them. Later, the family has dinner together, and Yash tells a story about a first date he went on. They went to a book store and saw a giant display for Jordan's new novel. At the end of the night, Yash leaves, and Jordan contemplates telling him about her pregnancy and the baby girl she gave up for adoption, but ultimately doesn't.

=== Part three ===
Jordan is now in her 40s. Her eldest son has cancer and suffers from seizures due to the pain. He is on a waiting list for a big surgery in Texas that, if successful, will give him some relief to his symptoms. She travels to the hospital to visit Yash, who also has cancer, but is now in hospice care. When she gets to the hospital, Yash is surrounded by many family and friends that Jordan has not seen in many years. Sam is also there, with his own children, now divorced. He has been Yash's support system throughout treatment.

Silas encourages Jordan to tell Yash about the pregnancy before he passes away, but Jordan is hesitant. She misses her flights, one, twice, and eventually three times, after getting caught up at the hospital. Jordan finally tells Yash about their daughter, a girl she named Daisy, who would now be 27 years old but has not yet contacted her. Yash is happy. At home, Jordan's son gets accepted to the surgery in Houston. She must leave to go meet her family, so she says goodbye to Yash. Later, Sam texts her that Yash passed away.

== Development ==
=== Inspiration ===
Lily King based the novel on her own experience with a love triangle in her college 17th-century literature class at the University of North Carolina. She became friends with three juniors and seniors, J.B., Jeff, and Kevin, the first two of whom she would later go on to date. Both Kevin and Jeff passed away at young ages due to cancer.

The protagonist of Heart the Lover is revealed later in the book to be Casey Peabody, the same protagonist of King's earlier novel Writers & Lovers. Speaking to Literary Hub, King has said this was not initially her intention, but after writing for some time, she realized the characters had to be the same.

King has said that her main interest was portraying the 30 years after their senior year of college. Part one of the novel was initially only going to be a short backstory for the more important sections, but it eventually became larger.

=== Publication history ===
The novel was published in the United States by Grove Press on October 7, 2025. It was published in the United Kingdom by Canongate Books.

== Reception ==
The Times published a positive review, noting several references in the book to other love triangles and describing the prose as being "steeped in yearning." John Warner, writing in the Chicago Tribune, praised the prose for being "sincere." Priscilla Gilman expressed a similar sentiment in The Boston Globe, while Ron Charles praised the novel's dialogue and plot.

Kirkus Reviews gave the novel a starred review, praising King's characterization and drawing a contrast between the book's campus setting and dark academia novels. Publishers Weekly was more mixed, describing the plot as "clunky melodrama" and arguing that it lacked "the staying power" of King's earlier work. Shelf Awareness and Booklist both praised the novel, with the former positively comparing the book to King's previous novel Writers & Lovers and the latter applauding the plot.

The novel was longlisted for the 2025 National Book Critics Circle Award for Fiction.
