= Writers & Lovers =

2020 novel by Lily King

- First edition
- Author: Lily King
- Language: English
- Series: Casey Peabody
- Published: 2020
- Publisher: Grove Press
- Publication place: United States
- Pages: 320
- ISBN: 978-0802148537
- Followed by: Heart the Lover

Writers & Lovers is a 2020 novel by American author Lily King. King’s fifth novel, it follows aspiring writer Casey Peabody as she strives to move from one phase of her life into the next amid grief, joy, romance, and artistic fulfillment.

== Synopsis ==
In 1997, Casey Peabody is a woman in her 30s who struggles to define her life as she is deeply in debt, feels uninspired to finish the novel she is working on, and is still reeling from her mother's untimely death a few months earlier. Shortly after her mother's death she was accepted to a writer's residency. Unable to delay, Casey accepted the position and fell in love with a fellow writer, Luke, who is grieving the death of his child. After the residency, Casey learns he is still married and ends their relationship.

Casey is friends with Muriel, another struggling writer who participates in a workshop run by Oscar, a middle-aged widower. Muriel invites Casey to Oscar's book launch, where she meets Silas, a fellow writer with whom she immediately connects as he struggled with his sister's untimely death. But Silas departs for a long impromptu road trip just before their date, leaving Casey hurt.

At her waitressing job, Casey serves Oscar and his two young sons. Casey is charmed by his children, and when Oscar asks her on a date, she accepts. Shortly thereafter, Silas returns. Casey is charmed by Oscar's solidity but feels a strong physical attraction to Silas. She decides that she is sick of Silas's flightiness and begins to seriously date Oscar.

Casey finishes her book and sends it to agents. To her surprise, an assistant agent offers to represent the book and make Casey her first client. Casey accepts. Then her landlord tells her he is selling the land she lives on. Oscar offers to let her live with him and his boys, but she struggles with committing to their relationship as he shows flashes of arrogance and disinterest in her life. After a confrontation with an abrasive cook, Casey loses her job.

Casey has a cancer scare. After finding out that the lump in her breast is a lymph node, she decides to leave Oscar for good and pursue Silas. To her surprise, a teaching job Muriel set up that Casey thought she botched comes through. Casey's agent starts a bidding war for her novel, and it sells for enough money that Casey can pay her debts.

After Silas admits that he backed off after learning that Casey was dating Oscar, she tells him that she and Oscar have broken up and the two begin a relationship.

== Principal characters ==
- Casey Peabody, the 31-year-old protagonist who is an aspiring writer and works as a waitress at the Iris
- Oscar, a 45-year-old writer with two children whose wife passed away some years ago, and is one of Casey's romantic interests
- Silas, an aspiring writer and high school teacher who is another one of Casey's romantic interests
- Luke, an ex-boyfriend of Casey's that left her very upset
- Muriel, Casey's friend who is also a novelist
- Harry, Casey's friend who also works as a waiter at the Iris

== Reception ==
Maureen Corrigan of NPR called Writers & Lovers "a funny and compassionate novel about the cost of sticking with the same dream for what may be too long". In The Washington Post, Ron Charles called it "an absolute delight, the kind of happiness that sometimes slingshots out of despair with such force you can't help but cheer, amazed".

== Awards ==
Year	Award	Category	Result	Ref.
2020	Goodreads Choice Awards	—	Nominated	
2020	New England Book Award	—	Finalist	

== Adaptation ==
It was announced in 2021 that Toni Collette would make her directorial debut with an adaptation of Writers & Lovers and that King would co-write the screenplay with Nick Payne.
