= Stiffed: The Betrayal of the American Man =

1999 book by Susan Faludi

- First edition
- Author: Susan Faludi
- Subject: Masculinity
- Publisher: HarperCollins
- Publication date: 1999
- Media type: Print (Paperback)
- ISBN: 978-0380720453

Stiffed: The Betrayal of the American Man is a 1999 book by feminist author Susan Faludi, her followup to Backlash: The Undeclared War Against American Women. The book addresses the state of masculinity in late-20th-century America.

Faludi explores various topics including job losses from the closure of the Long Beach Naval Shipyard, hazing at The Citadel, the effects on the local Dawg Pound fan base as the original Cleveland Browns pondered a move to Baltimore, the rise of the Promise Keepers movement, male roles in the 1960s New Left, the My Lai Massacre, the making of the film Rambo: First Blood, the Waco Siege and the making of the subsequent documentary film Waco: The Rules of Engagement, the Project Apollo Moon landings, and men in the pornography industry.

The common theme that runs through the book is that men have attempted to live up to the expectations of masculinity established in post-World War II America, only to find society not living up to its end of the bargain as globalization, downsizing and other economic pressures have made it difficult for men to live up to their expected roles as providers. At the same time, she applies a feminist critique to these expectations, while noting that the feminist critique of the rise of an ornamental culture applies to men as much as women: As the culture has shifted toward an ornamental one in which awards, popular culture symbols of ideal masculinity, and economic bottom lines have become the societal norms of success, ordinary men are losing self-esteem and a sense of purpose. In particular, she links the problems of many men today with abusive or absent fathers when growing up, and is critical of the rise of a corporate "organization man" culture in the 1950s and 1960s, which led to absent fathers failing to provide a positive, nurturing environment to their children, and then to failed expectations as companies laid off longtime loyal employees during the 1980s and 1990s.
