= Katie Williams (author) =

American writer

Katie Williams is an American writer who is known for her 2018 novel Tell the Machine Goodnight which was a finalist for the Kirkus Prize and her 2023 novel My Murder.

== Early life and education ==
Williams grew up in Okemos, Michigan. She attended the University of Michigan where she earned a BA in English and the University of Texas at Austin, where she earned an MFA in fiction.

== Career ==
Her 2018 novel Tell the Machine Goodnight is about Pearl, who works for a company which produces Apricity machines—devices that can tell people exactly what they need to be happy only by obtaining a small amount of DNA, such as from a cheek swab. Pearl's son Rhett, who is suffering from severe anorexia, does not want to use this machine despite his mother's insistence and highly values his own autonomy and self-determination. Writing for NPR, Jason Sheehan stated that the work was "sci-fi in its most perfect expression—no robots, no explosions, no car chases. Reading it is like having a lucid dream of six years from next week, filled with people you don't know, but will." Writing for the New York Times in a favorable review, author Matt Haig said that the work, unlike many other science fiction examples, features characters that are warm, endearing and complex which the reader is apt to develop a personal connection to. Haig concludes: "...what raises it above another clever-clever slab of science fiction is that its characters are complex and contradictory and real. For better or worse, you care about them."

In the novel My Murder, a woman named Louise, who was murdered by a serial killer, is cloned by a secretive agency and brought back to her former life as a new mother and wife at the same age that she was killed. During the cloning process her previous memories as well as personality are also replicated, leaving her with a continuum of her previous life; however, she has memory gaps around the time of her murder. Four other victims of this serial killer are also cloned via the same process and the five survivors attend a support group. Upon returning to her previous life as a clone, Louise must then solve the mystery of who killed her. Reviewing the book for the New York Times, writer Dan Chaon stated: "My Murder is on of those rare emotionally intelligent books that are also fun reads, and it even manages to perform two or three plot turns that are so masterly that they would make Ira Levin blush."

Williams is also the author of two young adult novels, The Space Between Trees (2010) and Absent (2013). Her other works have appeared in The Atlantic, Best American Fantasy, American Short Fiction, Prairie Schooner, and Subtropics. She currently teaches fiction writing at Emerson College.
