= The Terror Dream =

2007 book by Susan Faludi

- Cover of the first edition
- Author: Susan Faludi
- Language: English
- Subject: Terrorism
- Publisher: Macmillan Publishers
- Publication date: 2007
- Publication place: United States
- Media type: Print (Hardcover and Paperback)
- Pages: 480
- ISBN: 978-0312428006

The Terror Dream: Fear and Fantasy in Post-9/11 America is a 2007 book by Susan Faludi, in which the author argues that the terrorist acts of September 11, 2001 resulted in an attack on feminism. In 2007, the book was a finalist for the National Book Critics Circle Award for Criticism.

== Context ==
"On September 11, 2001, 19 militants associated with the Islamic extremist group al-Qaeda hijacked four airliners and carried out suicide attacks against targets in the United States. Two of the planes were flown into the towers of the World Trade Center in New York City, a third plane hit the Pentagon just outside Washington, D.C., and the fourth plane crashed in a field in Pennsylvania. The total number of people killed because of these attacks was 2,753. The ratio of men to women killed during the attacks was 3:1. Faludi describes mass amounts of volunteers traveling from all over the country to help the victims. However, there were very few survivors to help. 21,744 remains were found while only 291 bodies were found "intact".

The suddenness of the attacks and the finality of the towers’ collapse and the planes’ obliteration left us with little in the way of ongoing chronicle or ennobling narrative. So a narrative was created and populated with pasteboard protagonists whose exploits would exist almost entirely in the realm of American archetype and American fantasy.

== Synopsis ==
Faludi analyzes U.S. media, politics, and popular culture to find the answer to American society's attempt to restore "traditional" manhood and gender roles after the 9/11 attacks. She supports her ideas with newspaper accounts and television transcripts, along with anecdotal and qualitative evidence.

The first half, "Ontogeny", examines Americans' emotional reactions immediately the events of 9/11. Faludi's research revealed numerous instances where media accounts of the attack reinforced myths about "John Wayne" types of men, particularly New York firemen, rescuing "damsels in distress".

Faludi cites accounts of the United Airlines Flight 93 events as providing one of the clearest examples of men as heroic rescuers of women, and of women as passive victims. Because cellphone calls and flight recordings provided scant evidence of what had happened and who had taken what actions, media coverage relied on interviews with widows who were prompted to describe their husbands in larger-than-life terms and to speculate on how they overcame the hijackers. Flight attendant Sandra Bradshaw and other women, who had called family to describe their own plans to attack the terrorists, were barely mentioned in the press.

Faludi covers criticism and ridicule aimed at the Jersey Girls, a group of widows who demanded, and got, an independent commission to investigate the attacks and the government's failure to stop them. Feminism of any kind, or even the widows' later moving on with their lives, was denounced as unpatriotic. Government propaganda about the war in Afghanistan focused on American military men protecting American women and going to Afghanistan to save their women from oppression. There was also a significant decrease in the number of sexual discrimination cases prosecuted in federal courts. The overall cultural atmosphere affected style, home design, hobbies, food and other health choices, and decisions to marry and have children.

Part Two, "Phylogeny", traces the history of American culture's long history of captivity narratives, and their romanticization in novels and films, focusing especially John Ford's The Searchers. In the chapter "Precious Little Jessi", Faludi examines Jessica Lynch's experience as a prisoner of war, as opposed to how she was represented by military spokesmen and in the media. Lynch was originally portrayed as a tough girl, but the media soon cast her as a fragile waif who needed saving. Lori Piestewa (Hopi), whom Lynch credits with saving her life before being killed, and Shoshanna Johnson, who like Lynch was taken prisoner and survived, were sidelined in the press, because they did not fit the preferred image. Throughout history, the image of a "manly" man protecting helpless females has seemed necessary to convey the message that America could defend itself from any foreign entities. Faludi argues that the 9/11 attacks caused Americans to return to these myths that have been ingrained into the national psyche, attempting to restore traditional gender roles out of fear.

Faludi concludes that positive action is needed by both women and men, if America is to become an equal society embracing diversity and individual talents, instead of retreating to false ideologies that do more harm than good:

We live at a moment of great possibility. By returning us to the original trauma that produced our national myth, the attacks on 9/11 present us with a historic watershed: faced with a replay of our formative experience, we have the opportunity to resolve the old story in a new way that honors the country and its citizens. We never really lacked that capacity. We just buried it under a fantasy. September 11 offers us, even now, the chance to revisit that past and reverse that long denial, to imagine a national identity grounded not on virile illusion but on the talents and vitality of all of us equally, men and women both.

== Reception ==
The Terror Dream was met with mixed reviews by critics. In a review published in USA Today, Olivia Barker stated the book was "probing and provocative". However, Barker criticized Faludi for using secondhand sources and not interviewing sources herself. In addition, Barker criticized Faludi for not giving the media individuals she attacked in her book a chance to explain themselves. Author Carol Anne Douglas stated, "Faludi's book certainly makes a point, but it lacked an economic analysis". A professor at the University of East Anglia, Sarah Churchwell, applauded Faludi's argument. However, Churchwell criticized that Faludi exaggerated and created myths of her own. In the review, Churchwell said, "Ultimately Faludi is guilty of her own exaggerations and mythmaking, strong-arming her argument into submission - which is a pity, because it was so unnecessary."

New York Times journalist, Michiko Kakutani, was highly critical of The Terror Dream. "This, sadly, is the sort of tendentious, self important, sloppily reasoned book that gives feminism a bad name." She accused Faludi of using the 9/11 attacks as a platform to restate many of the arguments she made in Backlash. In addition, Kakutani accused Faludi of ignoring evidence that would discredit her theories while providing anecdotal evidence to support them. Kakutani stated, "...ill conceived and poorly executed book-a book that stands as one of the more nonsensical volumes yet published about the aftermath of 9/11." Another NY Times journalist, John Leonard, had a much more positive view of Faludi's The Terror Dream. Leonard stated, "In The Terror Dream a skeptical Faludi reads everything, second-guesses everybody, watches too much talking-head TV and emerges from the archives and the pulp id like an exorcist and a Penthesilea."

In 2007, the book was a finalist for the National Book Critics Circle Award for Criticism.
