= Loubna Mrie =

Syrian activist (born 1991)

Loubna Mrie (Arabic: لبنى مرعي; born 1991) is a Syrian civil rights activist and writer based in the United States.

== Life ==
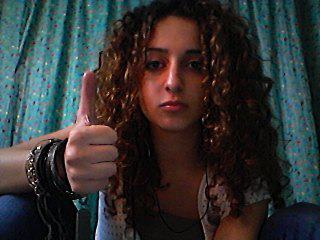
Loubna Mrie in 2013

Mrie comes from an Alawite family from a village near Latakia. Her father was a government hired enforcer and paid assassin in Syrian Air Force Intelligence. Despite her family ties, she became one of a few Alawites to join the fight against the Assad regime, which led to the abduction and killing of her mother by her father and his allies.

As rioting broke out in the initial stages of the Syrian civil war, Loubna attended Latakia University, but moved to Damascus in 2012 as Latakia was deemed to be unsafe for activists after Assad's troops opened fire on civilian protestors. She later joined the Free Syrian Army (FSA), where she helped with the transport of food and medical aid, then with the smuggling of ammunition. She promoted the aims of the revolution in the Alawitian community and spoke with the victims of government-affiliated troops. After her father attempted to use a phone message from her abducted mother to lure Loubna back to Syria, she fled in August 2012 to Turkey.

On August 11, 2012, her mother was abducted by her father and his allies. Loubna later received information from an unidentified caller about the death of her mother.

She later became a photojournalist with Reuters based in Aleppo, where she covered the conflict, then moved to New York, where she is a researcher and commentator on Syrian and Middle Eastern affairs. She has been published in The Washington Post, Rosa-Luxemburg-Stiftung, The Atlantic and The New Republic, among other publications.

In 2026, her first book, Defiance: A Memoir of Awakening, Rebellion, and Survival in Syria, was published by Viking. It was a Finalist for the 2026 Kirkus Prize for Nonfiction.
