= All the Living =

2009 debut novel of American author C. E. Morgan

- Author: C. E. Morgan
- Language: English
- Set in: Kentucky
- Publisher: Farrar, Straus and Giroux
- Publication date: 2009
- Publication place: United States
- Media type: Print (hardcover)

All the Living is the 2009 debut novel of American author C. E. Morgan.

== Writing and development ==
Morgan wrote the novel over the course of a fourteen-day period.

== Reception ==
=== Critical reception ===
Critics writing for Tin House and The Boston Globe highlighted the quality of Morgan's prose.

=== Honors ===
The novel was a finalist for the Hemingway Foundation/PEN Award.
