= My Monticello =

2021 novel by Jocelyn Johnson

- Author: Jocelyn Nicole Johnson
- Language: English
- Genre: Literary fiction, Historical fiction
- Publisher: Henry Holt
- Publication date: October 5, 2021
- Publication place: United States
- Media type: Print

My Monticello is a 2021 fiction collection written by debut author Jocelyn Nicole Johnson, published October 5, 2021 by Henry Holt and Co. The books consists of five short stories and an eponymous novella.

== Contents ==
- "Control Negro"
- "Virginia Is Not Your Home"
- "Something Sweet on Our Tongues"
- "Buying a House Ahead of the Apocalyse"
- "The King of Xandria"
- My Monticello

== Reception ==
My Monticello received starred reviews from Booklist, Publishers Weekly, and Kirkus Reviews, as well as positive reviews from The Washington Post, The New York Times, Book Page, Book Reporter, The Today Show, People, Time, Ms., Chicago Tribune, and Esquire.

The book was a finalist for the 2021 Kirkus Prize for Fiction. My Monticello also won the 2021 Weatherford Prize, the 2022 Library of Virginia Fiction Award, the 2022 Lillian Smith Book Award, and has been recognized as a finalist for the Kirkus Prize, the National Book Critics Circle Leonard Prize, the Los Angeles Times Art Seidenbaum Prize, the Balcones Fiction Prize, the Library of Virginia's Annual Literary Awards, and the Library of Virginia's People Choice Awards for Fiction. The novel has also been long-listed for the PEN/Faulkner Award for Fiction and the Story Prize. In 2022, My Monticello was also chosen as the Route 1 Reads book for Virginia.

== Adaptation ==
The My Monticello audiobook is narrated by Aja Naomi King, January LaVoy, Landon Woodson, LeVar Burton, Ngozi Anyanwu, and Adetomiwa Edun.

The book is also being adapted to a film produced by Chernin Entertainment and aired on Netflix. Bryan Parker will adapt the screenplay, Peter Chernin and Jenno Topping will produce it for Chernin Entertainment, and Kaitlin Dahill and Johnson will serve as executive producers.
