= Jocelyn Nicole Johnson =

American teacher and author

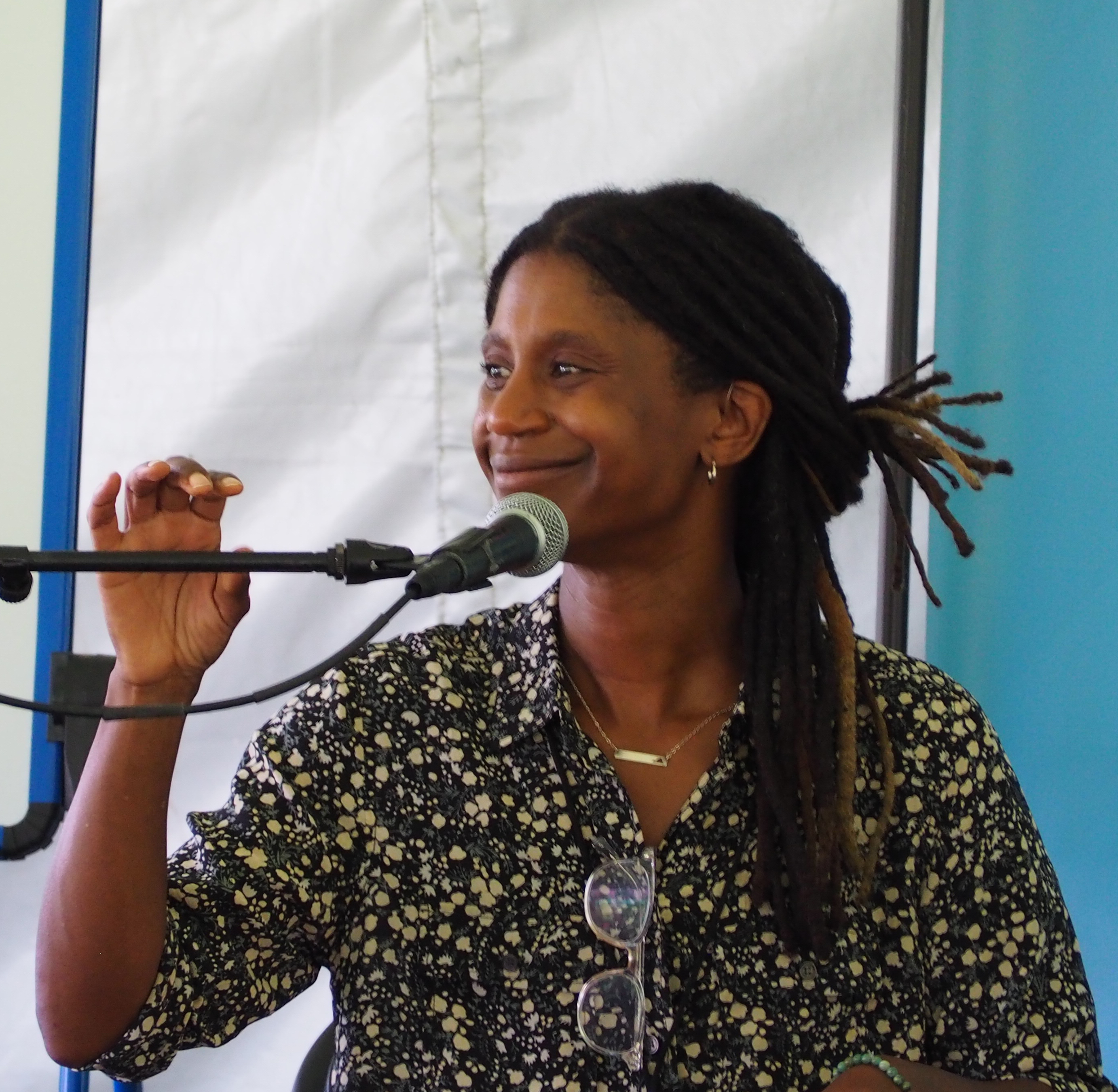
- Occupation: Teacher and author
- Notable works: My Monticello
- Notable awards: Weatherford Prize (2021); Library of Virginia Fiction Award (2022); Lillian Smith Book Award (2022)

Website
- www.jocelynjohnson.com

Jocelyn Nicole Johnson is an American teacher and author.

== Biography ==
Johnson grew up in Reston, Virginia, and attended the Young Writer's Workshop at the University of Virginia while she was still in high school. She graduated from James Madison University with a Bachelor of Science in Fine Art and Education. She went on to pursue a career teaching visual arts in public schools, mostly to elementary-aged students, in Harrisonburg City Schools, Arlington County Public Schools, Albemarle County Public Schools, and Charlottesville City Public Schools.

Johnson attended a number of workshops and residences, including: Provincetown Fine Arts Workcenter, Tin House Summer Workshops, Virginia Center for the Creative Arts, and Hedgebrook. Johnson's short story, "Control Negro", was anthologized in The Best American Short Stories 2018, guest edited by Roxane Gay, who tweeted that it was "one hell of a story."

In 2021, Henry Holt published Johnson's debut collection, My Monticello, five short stories and a novella, all set in Virginia, which received positive reviews from The New York Times, The Washington Post, The Guardian, and NPR, among other publications. The New York Times listed My Monticello as one of the 10 best fiction books of 2021 and as a "notable book of the year" and The Washington Post and NPR also similarly listed Johnson's work as notable and well-loved fiction works of the year.

In addition, My Monticello won the 2021 Weatherford Prize, the 2022 Library of Virginia Fiction Award, the 2022 Lillian Smith Book Award, and has been recognized as a finalist for the Kirkus Prize, National Book Critics Circle Leonard Prize, the Los Angeles Times Art Seidenbaum Prize, the Balcones Fiction Prize, the Library of Virginia's Annual Literary Awards, and the Library of Virginia's People Choice Awards for Fiction. My Monticello has also been longlisted for the PEN/Faulkner Award for Fiction and The Story Prize. My Monticello has also been selected as Virginia's Route 1 Reads selection for 2022. Johnson's work is mostly set in and around Charlottesville, Virginia, and it explores themes such as racial and environmental anxieties, troubled histories, and complicated notions of home.

My Monticello is being adapted for a Netflix film.

== Bibliography ==
- —— (2021). My Monticello. Henry Holt and Co.
