= Derrick Barnes (author) =

American children's author

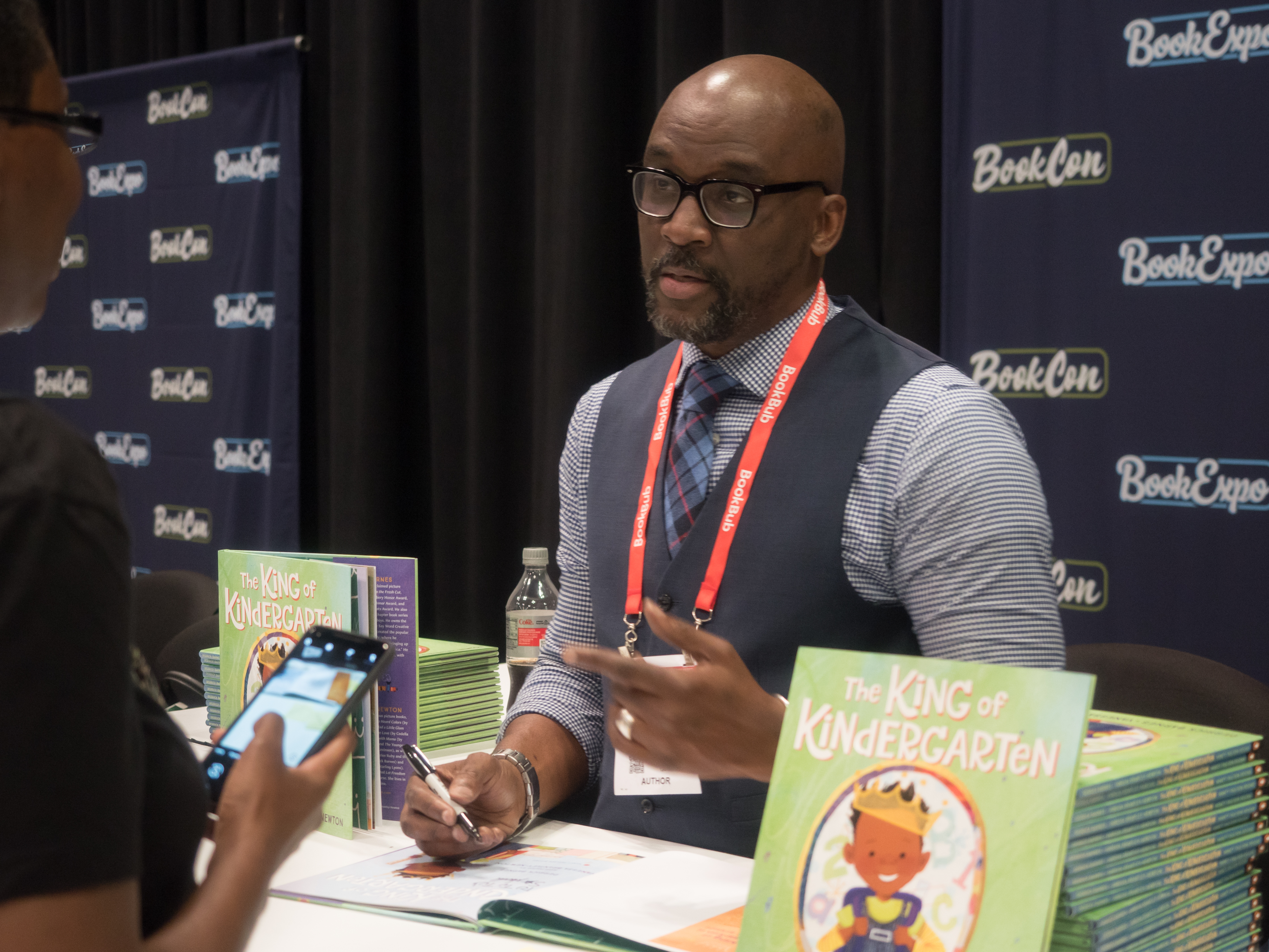
- Barnes at BookExpo 2019
- Born: United States
- Occupation: Children's author
- Notable awards: Ezra Jack Keats Book Award; Caldecott Honor; Newbery Honor; Coretta Scott King Award; Kirkus Prize

Website
- derrickdbarnes.com

Derrick Barnes is an American author. He is known for writing several popular series of children's books and is a former staff writer for Hallmark greeting cards. In 2018 Barnes received several awards that include the Newbery Honor and Coretta Scott King Award for his 2017 book Crown: An Ode to the Fresh Cut.

Barnes' books celebrate African American culture and feature positive images of black children in everyday life.

== Career ==
Barnes began his writing career in 1999 as the first full-time black male copywriter for Hallmark. In 2003, he left Hallmark and moved to New Orleans, where he worked a variety of jobs before signing a multi-book deal with children's book publisher Scholastic.

In 2011, Barnes began working part-time in the Kansas City Public Library's outreach department. As part of the library's "Stories to Go" program, Barnes was hired to travel to sites such as schools, daycares, and churches reading to children, and share stories with them.

== Books ==
In 2004, Scholastic published his books The Low-down, Bad-day Blues, and Stop, Drop, and Chill. Barnes' first young adult book, The Making of Dr. Truelove, was published in 2008. The story, about a 16-year-old boy and his pursuit of the girl of his dreams, revolves around relationships and sexuality, and the book was ranked as one of the top 100 books for teens by the New York Public Library.

=== Ruby and the Booker Boys ===
Barnes' popular series of books entitled Ruby and the Booker Boys covers the story of Ruby Booker, a sassy third grader trying to make a name for herself in the shadow of her three older brothers. The series started with two books published simultaneously in 2008, Brand New School, Brave New Ruby and Trivia Queen, 3rd Grade Supreme. The sequel The Slumber Party Payback was released the same year, and Ruby Flips For Attention was released in 2009. Critical reviews of the series highlighted Barnes' ability to create positive stories for young readers. Critical Survey of Children's Literature wrote, "The warm and gentle themes and images of the Ruby series—a loving family, quirky but confident children, a vibrant sense of community spirit, a joy in diversity—provide a literary reflection of an African American reality not often represented in children’s literature or popular culture."

=== We Could Be Brothers ===
We Could Be Brothers, a hardcover novel written for young teenagers, tells the story of two middle-grade boys with two different upbringings who both attend the same school. The book explores coming-of-age themes, including race, self-respect, women, and what it means to grow up as a black kid in American society. It was published by Scholastic in 2010. Critics praised its story line and its focus on the themes of friendship and community.

=== Crown: An Ode to the Fresh Cut ===
Barnes' first picture book, Crown: An Ode to the Fresh Cut, illustrated by Gordon C. James, was published in 2017 to critical acclaim. The story is about a young black boy and his experience getting a haircut in a barbershop. It explores aspects of African American culture, and celebrates themes of self-confidence and pride. Crown was well received, featuring at the 2018 ALA Youth Media Awards and winning several awards including a 2018 Newbery Honor (for content), a Caldecott Honor (for illustrations), a Coretta Scott King Award (for both author and illustrator), the Ezra Jack Keats Book Award (writer and illustrator), and the $50,000 Kirkus Prize.

=== The King of Kindergarten ===
The picture book The King of Kindergarten illustrated by Vanessa Brantley-Newton was released in July 2019.

=== I Am Every Good Thing ===
Barnes' 2020 book, I Am Every Good Thing, won the 2020 Kirkus Prize for young people's literature, as well as The NCTE Charlotte Huck Award.

== Influences ==
Barnes has identified Stevie Wonder and Langston Hughes as influences, saying that "Hughes and his Simple short-story series helped him learn about dialogue and character development, while the liner notes of Wonder's albums inspired Barnes to manipulate language the way the songsmith did to add rhythm to his writing style. He recounts reading the liner notes as a seven-year-old child, enthralled by the language."

In an interview with The Kansas City Star, Barnes explained that there aren't enough books about kids of color by people of color. "I want to leave behind a body of work my children can be proud of, but I also want to change how children see themselves in this world. I want to thwart those negative images and make sure they know they are loved."

== Personal life ==
Barnes grew up in Kansas City, Missouri, reading many picture books from a young age. Barnes graduated from Jackson State University with a degree in Marketing. Barnes, his wife Dr. Tinka Barnes, and their four sons currently reside in Charlotte, North Carolina.

== List of works ==
- The Low-down, Bad-day Blues (2004)
- Stop, Drop and Chill (2004)
- The Making of Dr. Truelove (2008)
- Ruby and the Booker Boys series:
  - Brand New School, Brave New Ruby (2008)
  - Trivia Queen, 3rd Grade Supreme (2008)
  - The Slumber Party Payback (2008)
  - Ruby Flips For Attention (2009)
- We Could Be Brothers (2010)
- Crown: An Ode to the Fresh Cut (2017)
- The King of Kindergarten (2019)
- Who Got Game?: Baseball (2020)
- I Am Every Good Thing (2020)
- The Queen of Kindergarten (2022)
- Victory. Stand!-Raising My Fist For Justice (2022)
