= Katherine E. Standefer =

American writer (born 1979)

- Born: 1985 (age 39–40); Arlington Heights, Illinois, U.S.
- Education: Colorado College; University of Arizona
- Occupation: Writer
- Website: www.katherinestandefer.com

Katherine E. Standefer is an American writer of creative nonfiction. She was a recipient of the 2015 Iowa Review Award in Nonfiction.

== Biography ==
She was born in the Chicago metropolitan area and currently lives in Wyoming. Standefer's book Lightning Flowers: My Journey to Uncover the Cost of Saving A Life was a non-fiction finalist for the Kirkus Prize in 2020. She has also written for High Country News and the Los Angeles Times. In 2018, Standefer was a Logan Nonfiction Fellow at The Carey Institute for Global Good in Rensselaerville, New York.

Lightning Flowers: My Journey to Uncover the Cost of Saving A Life was also a New York Times Book Review Editor's Choice/Staff Pick and a NYTBR's Group Text Pick. It was named one of the Best Books of Fall 2020 by O, The Oprah Magazine.

Standefer's work appeared in The Best American Essays (BAE) 2016.

== Awards and recognition ==
She was named “notable” in BAE 2017, 2019, and 2020. She won the 2015 Iowa Review Award in Nonfiction.
