= Susan Faludi =

American feminist author and journalist

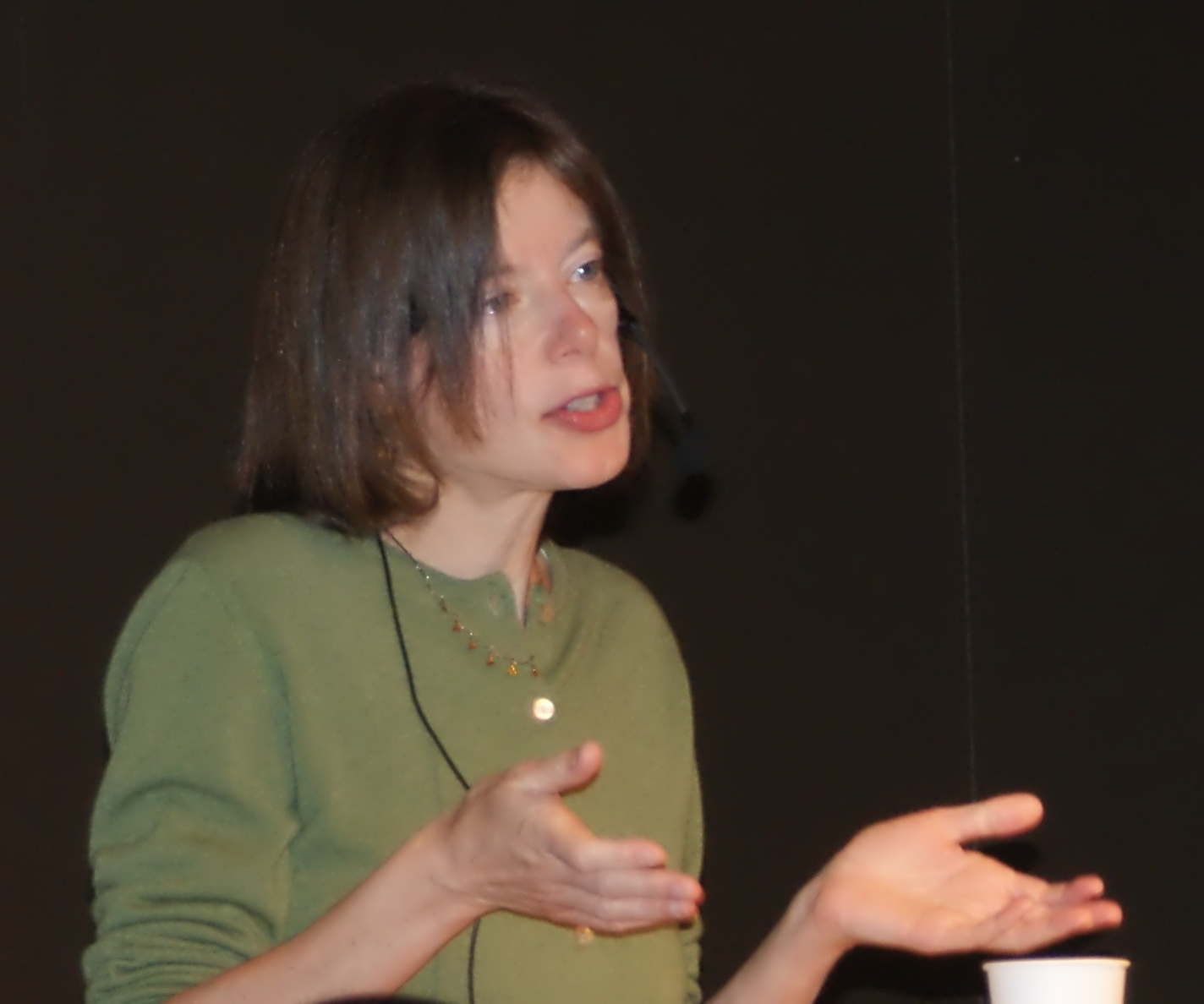
- Faludi in 2008
- Born: Susan Charlotte Faludi; April 18, 1959 (age 67); New York City, New York, United States
- Education: Harvard University (BA)
- Occupation: Journalist
- Notable work: Backlash; In the Darkroom
- Awards: Pulitzer Prize for Explanatory Journalism (1991); Kirkus Prize (2016)

Susan Charlotte Faludi (/fəˈluːdi/; born April 18, 1959) is an American journalist and feminist author. She won a Pulitzer Prize for Explanatory Journalism in 1991, for a report on the leveraged buyout of Safeway, a report that the Pulitzer Prize committee commended for depicting the "human costs of high finance." She was awarded the Kirkus Prize for Nonfiction in 2016 for In the Darkroom, which was also a finalist for the 2017 Pulitzer Prize for Biography.

== Early life and education ==
Susan Faludi was born in 1959 in Queens, New York, and grew up in Yorktown Heights. She was born to Marilyn Lanning, a homemaker and journalist, and Stefánie Faludi, a photographer. Stefánie Faludi was a Jewish survivor of the Holocaust who had emigrated from Hungary. In 2004 she came out to Susan as a transgender woman, and died in 2015. Susan Faludi has dual US & Hungarian citizenship. Her maternal grandfather was also Jewish.

Faludi attended Harvard University, where she was elected to Phi Beta Kappa and served as managing editor of The Harvard Crimson. She graduated in 1981 with a Bachelor of Arts in history and literature.

== Career ==
Faludi became a professional journalist, writing for The New York Times, the Miami Herald, The Atlanta Journal-Constitution, the San Jose Mercury News, and The Wall Street Journal, among other publications.

During the 1980s, Faludi wrote several articles on feminism and the apparent resistance to the movement. Seeing a pattern emerge, she wrote her first book, Backlash: The Undeclared War Against American Women, about this manufactured media resistance to feminism, which was released in late 1991.

She won a Pulitzer Prize for Explanatory Journalism in 1991, for a report in The Wall Street Journal on the leveraged buyout of Safeway.

In 2008–2009, Faludi was a fellow at the Radcliffe Institute for Advanced Study at Harvard University, and during the 2013–2014 academic year, she was the Tallman Scholar in the Gender and Women's Studies Program at Bowdoin College. Since January 2013, Faludi has been a contributing editor at The Baffler.

In 1996, Faludi was awarded honoris causa membership in Omicron Delta Kappa at SUNY Plattsburgh. In 2017, she was awarded an honorary doctorate from Stockholm University.

== Books ==
=== Backlash ===
Susan Faludi's 1991 book Backlash: The Undeclared War Against American Women argues that the 1980s saw a backlash against feminism, especially due to the spread of negative stereotypes against career-minded women. Faludi asserted that many who argue that women should stay home to look after children are hypocrites, since they have wives who are working mothers or, as women, are themselves working mothers. This work won her the National Book Critics Circle Award for Nonfiction in 1991. The book has become a classic feminist text.

In 2014, a public book club by Matter and MSNBC was started, where writers including Jill Abramson, Katha Pollitt, Lena Dunham, and Roxane Gay, reread chapters of the book and examined their contemporary relevance. In September 2015, Bustle included Backlash among its list of "25 Bestsellers from the last 25 years you simply must make time to read." Reflecting on the legacy of the book in The New Yorker in July 2022, Molly Fischer called Backlash "an era-defining phenomenon" that "presented a damningly methodical assessment of women’s status in Reagan-era America." Backlash has been translated into Spanish, Portuguese, Polish, German, Finnish, Korean, and Italian.

=== Stiffed ===
In Faludi's 1999 book Stiffed: The Betrayal of the American Man, Faludi analyzes the state of American masculinity. Faludi argues that while many of those in power are men, most individual men have little power. American men have been brought up to be strong, support their families, and work hard, but many men then find themselves underpaid or unemployed, disillusioned, and abandoned by their wives. Changes in American society have affected both men and women, Faludi concludes, and it is wrong to blame individual men for class differences, or for differences in individual luck and ability, that they did not cause and from which men and women both suffer.

=== The Terror Dream ===
In The Terror Dream (2007), Faludi analyzes the aftermath of the September 11 attacks in the context of American history going back to insecurity on the historical American frontier. Faludi argues that the 9/11 attacks reinvigorated a climate in America that is hostile to women, where women are viewed as weak and best suited to playing support roles for the men who protect them from attacks.

Kirkus Reviews called the book a "rich, incisive analysis of the surreality of American life in the wake of 9/11" and "brilliant, illuminating and essential." Reviewing the book for Fresh Air, Maureen Corrigan praised Faludi for her "characteristic restraint and depth of research" and for her "rigorous insistence on truth."

The book was disparaged as a "tendentious, self-important, sloppily reasoned work that gives feminism a bad name" by New York Times reviewer Michiko Kakutani. Another New York Times critic, John Leonard, wrote: "In The Terror Dream a skeptical Faludi reads everything, second-guesses everybody, [and] watches too much talking-head TV." Writing in The Guardian, Sarah Churchwell called the book "a persuasive analysis of post-9/11 sexism" but also said: "Ultimately Faludi is guilty of her own exaggerations and mythmaking, strong-arming her argument into submission."

=== In the Darkroom ===
In the Darkroom, published in 2016 by Henry Holt and Company, is about "modern transsexuality," inspired by Faludi's father coming out as a transgender woman. Writing in The New York Times, Michelle Goldberg called it a "rich, arresting and ultimately generous investigation of her father." Writing in The Guardian, Rachel Cooke described the book as "an elegant masterpiece" and "a searching investigation of identity barely disguised as a sometimes funny and sometimes very painful family saga." In the Darkroom won the 2016 Kirkus Prize for Nonfiction and was a finalist for the 2017 Pulitzer Prize for Biography.

== Views on feminism ==
Faludi has rejected the claim advanced by critics that there is a "rigid, monolithic feminist 'orthodoxy,'" noting as an example that she has disagreed with Gloria Steinem about pornography and Naomi Wolf about abortion.

Faludi has criticized the obscurantism prevalent in academic feminist theory: "There's this sort of narrowing specialization and use of coded, elitist language [...] which is to my mind impenetrable and not particularly useful." She has also characterized "academic feminism's love affair with deconstructionism" as "toothless", and warned that it "distract[s] from constructive engagement with the problems of the public world."

Backlash: The Undeclared War Against American Women has been described as an influential text of third-wave feminism.

== Personal life ==
Faludi is married to author Russ Rymer.

== Selected works ==
=== Books ===
- Backlash: The Undeclared War Against American Women. New York: Crown. 1991.
- Stiffed: The Betrayal of the American Man. New York: William Morrow. 1999.
- The Terror Dream: Fear and Fantasy in Post-9/11 America. New York: Metropolitan Books. 2007.
- In the Darkroom. New York: Metropolitan Books. 2016.

=== Articles ===
- Faludi, Susan (August 23, 2026). "The Barbie Backlash". New York Times.
- "Hag of Misery". The New York Review of Books. Vol. 70, no. 17. November 2, 2023.
- "Feminism Made a Faustian Bargain With Celebrity Culture. Now It's Paying the Price". The New York Times. June 20, 2022.
- "Trump's Thoroughly Modern Masculinity". The New York Times. October 29, 2020.
- "'Believe All Women' Is a Right-Wing Trap". The New York Times. May 18, 2020.
- "Death of a revolutionary". American Chronicles. The New Yorker. Vol. 89, no. 9. April 15, 2013.
- "Facebook feminism, like it or not". The Baffler (23). August 2013.
- "American Electra". Harper's Magazine. October 2010.
- "The Reckoning: Safeway LBO Yields Vast Profits but Exacts a Heavy Human Toll". The Wall Street Journal. May 16, 1990. Archived from the original on August 20, 2015.

== See also ==
- Third-wave feminism
- Jewish feminism
