= David Gordon (novelist) =

American writer

- Born: 1967 (age 58–59); New York City, U.S.
- Occupation: Novelist
- Writing career
- Notable work: The Serialist

David Gordon (born 1967) is an American novelist.

== Biography ==
Gordon initially worked as a writer and editor for adult magazines Hustler, Chic and Barely Legal in the 1990s before moving on to write novels.

His debut novel, The Serialist, won the 2011 First Novelist Award and was a finalist for the Mystery Writers of America's 2011 Edgar Allan Poe Award for Best First Novel. Its translation into Japanese by Aoki Chizuru as Niryū Shōsetsuka (二流小説家), lit. "Second-Rate Novelist" became a major hit, winning three literary contests and being turned into a full-length motion film of the same name by Toei, directed by Izaki Nobuaki and starring Kamikawa Takaya.

== Works ==
- The Serialist (2010). ISBN 9781439158487.
- Mystery Girl (2013). ISBN 9780544028586.
- White Tiger on Snow Mountain: Stories (2014). ISBN 9780544343740.
- The Bouncer (2018). ISBN 9780802128003.
- The Hard Stuff (2019). ISBN 9780802129567.
- Against the Law (2021). ISBN 9781613162262.
- The Wild Life (2022). ISBN 9781613162774.

=== Articles ===
- "[Letter from SoHo] The Forty-Year Rehearsal – The Wooster Group's endless work in progress". Harper's. Vol. 340, no. 2036. New York, NY, US: Harper's Magazine Foundation. January 2020. pp. 53–64. ISSN 0017-789X.
