= The Sport of Kings (novel) =

2016 novel by C. E. Morgan

- First edition cover
- Author: C. E. Morgan
- Audio read by: George Newbern
- Language: English
- Genre: Family saga
- Set in: Kentucky and Ohio
- Publisher: Farrar, Straus and Giroux
- Publication date: May 3, 2016
- Publication place: New York
- Media type: Print (hardcover)
- Pages: 560
- Awards: Kirkus Prize (2016)
- ISBN: 978-0-374-28108-3
- OCLC: 918995087
- Dewey Decimal: 813/.6
- LC Class: PS3613.O73 S68 2016

The Sport of Kings is a 2016 novel by C. E. Morgan. It is a family saga about horse racing set in Kentucky and Ohio.

It won the 2016 Kirkus Prize for Fiction and was a finalist for the 2017 Pulitzer Prize for Fiction.

== Reception ==
In a starred review, Kirkus Reviews called the novel "vaultingly ambitious, thrillingly well-written, charged with moral fervor and rueful compassion."

Publishers Weekly praised the novel's "authentically pungent shed-row atmosphere" but criticized its "series of melodramatic incidents that undermines the care with which Morgan has created these larger-than-life characters."

== Awards and nominations ==
- Winner, 2016 Kirkus Prize for Fiction
- Finalist, 2017 Pulitzer Prize for Fiction
- Shortlist, 2017 Women's Prize for Fiction
- Shortlist, 2017 Rathbones Folio Prize
- Longlist, 2017 Andrew Carnegie Medals for Excellence in Fiction
- Nominee, 2016 James Tait Black Memorial Prize for Fiction
