= First Novelist Award =

The VCU Cabell First Novelist Award is an American literary award for debut novels. It has been presented annually since 2002 on behalf of Virginia Commonwealth University's MFA in Creative Writing Program.

Nominations are solicited from MFA programs nationwide as well as from publishers, editors, agents, and writers. The prize includes $5000 cash and participation in an on-campus event in Richmond, Virginia that focuses on the creation, publication, and promotion processes involved with a first novel. The award is more formally known as the "Virginia Commonwealth University Cabell First Novelist Award."

== History ==
The award was created in 2001 by playwright Laura Browder and novelist Tom De Haven. In addition, Richmond writer and VCU alumnus David Baldacci funded and supported the fledgling award in its early years. In 2007, VCU Libraries became a partner with the VCU Department of English in offering the award, and helping fund the prize and a fellowship for a graduate student to oversee the award process. When the James Branch Cabell Library Associates began contributing generous financial support, the award was named for James Branch Cabell (1879-1958), a Richmond writer who gained a national reputation and is best known today as a pioneer in fantasy fiction. Current sponsors are the James Branch Cabell Library Associates, VCU Libraries, the VCU Department of English, Barnes & Noble at VCU, and the VCU College of Humanities and Sciences.

Created to recognize a rising new talent in the literary world who has successfully published a first novel, nominations are solicited nationwide from publishers, editors, agents, and writers. A panel of readers narrows the field to the four or five most promising new works of fiction. From that short list, three prominent judges, including the winner of the previous year’s award, choose the recipient of the Cabell First Novelist Award.

The award is presented at the annual Cabell First Novelist Night. During this event, VCU brings together the newly published author and his or her agent and editor for a reading and a panel that focuses on the creation, publication, and marketing processes involved with a first novel. Earlier in the day, the itinerary includes a luncheon and a visit with a graduate fiction workshop. The public reading, followed by a Q&A session and other events, draw together MFA and undergraduate writers, the VCU and Richmond literary communities, and the general public. Travel expenses to Richmond and lodging accommodations for the author, agent, and editor are provided, as well as a $5000 cash prize for the author.

== Previous winners ==
- 2002: Maribeth Fischer, The Language of Good-bye
- 2003: Isabel Zuber, Salt
- 2004: Michael Byers, Long for This World
- 2005: Lorraine Adams, Harbor
- 2006: Karen Fisher, A Sudden Country
- 2007: Peter Orner, The Second Coming of Mavala Shikongo
- 2008: Travis Holland, The Archivist's Story
- 2009: Deb Olin Unferth, Vacation
- 2010: Victor Lodato, Mathilda Savitch
- 2011: David Gordon, The Serialist
- 2012: Justin Torres, We the Animals
- 2013: Ramona Ausubel, No One Is Here Except All of Us
- 2014: Helene Wecker, The Golem and the Jinni
- 2015: Boris Fishman, A Replacement Life
- 2016: Angela Flournoy, The Turner House
- 2017: Jade Chang, The Wangs vs. the World
- 2018: Hernán Díaz, In the Distance
- 2019: Ling Ma, Severance
- 2020: John Englehardt, Bloomland
- 2021: Raven Leilani, Luster
- 2022: Dawnie Walton, The Final Revival of Opal & Nev
- 2023: Tess Gunty, The Rabbit Hutch
- 2024: Alice Winn, In Memoriam
- 2025: Anne de Marcken, It Lasts Forever and Then It's Over
