= C. E. Morgan =

American writer (born 1976)

- Born: 1976 (age 48–49)
- Occupation: Author
- Education: Berea College (BA); Harvard University (MDiv)
- Notable awards: Whiting Award (2013); Windham–Campbell Literature Prize (2016); Kirkus Prize (2016)

C. E. Morgan (born 1976) is an American author. She was a finalist for the 2017 Pulitzer Prize for Fiction for The Sport of Kings, winner of the 2016 Kirkus Prize and Windham–Campbell Literature Prize, and in 2009 was named a 5 under 35 honoree by the National Book Foundation.

== Biography ==
As an undergraduate, Morgan studied voice at Berea College, a tuition-free labor college for students from poor and working-class backgrounds in Appalachia. In exchange for a free education, all students work for the college while enrolled. Morgan also attended Harvard Divinity School, where she studied literature and religion. She wrote All the Living while at Harvard. She lives in Kentucky.

== Awards and honors ==
- 2009 National Book Foundation "5 under 35" award
- 2010 Lannan Literary Fellowship
- 2012 United States Artists Fellow award
- 2013 Whiting Award
- 2016 Windham–Campbell Literature Prizes (Fiction)
- 2016 Kirkus Prize (Fiction)
- 2017 Pulitzer Prize for Fiction Finalist

== Bibliography ==
=== Novels ===
- All the Living (2009)
- The Sport of Kings (2016)

=== Short stories ===
- "Over by Christmas", The New York Times, December 24, 2008
- "Twins", The New Yorker, June 14–21, 2010
- "My Friend, Nothing Is In Vain", Oxford American, Spring 2014

=== Essays and other writings ===
- "Foreword", Light in August by William Faulkner (Modern Library, 2002)
- "Introduction", A Circle in the Fire & Other Stories by Flannery O'Connor (Folio Society, 2013)
