= Crown: An Ode to the Fresh Cut =

2017 picture book by Derrick Barnes

- Author: Derrick Barnes
- Publisher: Denene Millner Books, Agate Publishing
- Publication date: October 10, 2017
- Pages: unpaged
- Awards: Caldecott Honor, Coretta Scott King Author and Illustrator Honor Awards, Newbery Honor
- ISBN: 978-1-57284-224-3
- OCLC: 1039547840

Crown: An Ode to the Fresh Cut, is a picture book by Derrick Barnes, published in 2017. illustrated by Gordon C. James. The book, Barnes' first picture book, is a poem describing a boy's feelings and experience while getting a haircut. James, who was not the initial choice for the project, employed oil painting techniques to produce illustrations influenced by the visual qualities and conventions of fine art.

Crown was well received, as Barnes received a 2018 Newbery Honor and Coretta Scott King Award for his writing, while James received a 2018 Caldecott Honor and Coretta Scott King Award for his illustrations. Critics noted the unique setting and the way it celebrated African Americans, especially African American boys.

== Plot ==
Told in the second person, the book describes a young black boy's experience at a barbershop where he gets a haircut.

== Conception ==
Barnes, who had previously written several middle grade chapter books, wrote a poem about a new haircut after seeing a friend's sketch of a teenager. He sold it after being asked whether he had any books about the life of a normal African American boy. Since this was Barnes' first picture book, he gave particular thought about how to divide up his poem across pages. Barnes was acquainted with James, and after he was rejected by several other illustrators, he approached James directly to do the illustrations, unusually for children's picture books. Barnes describes their connection as "meant to be", with James noting, "I think the key is that our artistic styles really complement each other."

Barnes said that while the word "fresh" was often seen as dated, he believed it was timeless when applied to a haircut in the black community. He reflected on his own feeling of independence and being the "best version of myself" after leaving the barber. Barnes was concerned that in converting the poem to book form it would lose its meaning, as it was spread across the pages of a picture book.

== Themes and illustrations ==
Critics emphasized the book's contemporary African American protagonist in a setting of importance to African American culture and the way the book could introduce audiences to a variety of haircuts with which they might not have been familiar. Several critics affirmed Barnes' author's note by noting that the barbershop was one of the few institutions, besides the church, which celebrates and honors African American boys. This celebration of the boy helped to reinforce the book's theme of self-confidence and pride. However, it was not just a celebration of boys but all African Americans, even women, as the boy imagines who else is sharing the barbershop with him. The title itself is an allusion to hats African American women will wear to church. This is all underscored by Barnes' "rhythmic" text brimming with cool.

== Illustrations ==
James said the cover came easily for him after reading the poem. He drew inspiration from the attitude of the boy narrator at the end of the book, and his goal for the cover was to evoke fine art or even photographs. After doing thumbnail drawings, James painted with oils on illustration board. Barnes' son, Silas, served as the model for the boy in the book while the barber is based on James' son's barber. James' oil color illustrations drew comparisons to those of Basquiat, thanks to the detailed realistic portraits which included a variety of unique and "beautiful" African-American skin tones and hairstyles. Critics praised the cover and noted that James' illustrations balanced the reality of getting a haircut with the more ephemeral feelings in the boy's imagination.

== Reception ==
The book was well-received. Its starred review in The Horn Book Magazine praised both the illustrations' portrayal of the protagonist and how "Barnes's descriptions make each page a serendipity." Kirkus awarded it a starred review and a 2018 Kirkus Prize for children, saying, "One of the best reads for young black boys in years, it should be in every library, media center, and, yes, barbershop." Additional starred reviews came from Publishers Weekly and School Library Journal. Elizabeth Bird, writing for School Library Journal, noted how "the interchange between the art and the words lights the very pages on fire"; several other critics also praised the complementary nature of the text and illustrations. The book appeared on several best of 2017 lists including those of NPR, Huffington Post, where contributor Minh Le noted its "flawless delivery" in calling it the most charming picture book of 2017, the Los Angeles Times, whose book editor Carolyn Kellog called it, "a real standout... it also does something important" and the Chicago Public Library ("Best Picture Books of 2017").

Crown was also noted as one of several books with diverse authors and topics that received recognition at the 2018 Youth Media Awards. Crown received four awards, including a Newbery Honor for Barnes, a Caldecott Honor for James, and Coretta Scott King Awards for both. The Caldecott committee praised James' "love-letter to the contemporary barbershop" and the Newbery committee similarly praised Barnes' "joyous paean to... a great haircut". Additionally, the book was recognized by the Ezra Jack Keats Book Award, with Barnes its winner for writing and James an honor winner for illustrations. The Keats citation stated, "In a tribute both stylish and timeless, Derrick Barnes’s exuberant text, along with Gordon C. James’s vivid illustrations, celebrate a cultural institution for African-American men and boys: the barber shop."
