= In the Darkroom =

2016 book by Susan Faludi

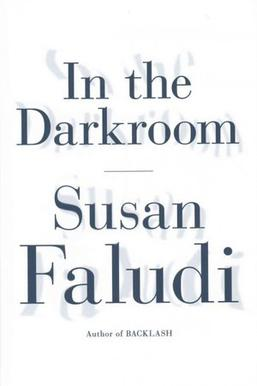
- Cover of the first edition
- Author: Susan Faludi
- Language: English
- Publisher: Metropolitan/Henry Holt
- Publication date: June 14, 2016
- Publication place: United States
- Media type: Print (hardback and paperback), e-book, audiobook
- Pages: 432
- Awards: Kirkus Prize (2016)
- ISBN: 978-0-8050-8908-0

In the Darkroom is a memoir by Susan Faludi that was first published on June 14, 2016. The memoir centers on the life of Faludi's father, who came out as transgender and underwent sex reassignment surgery at the age of 76. It won the 2016 Kirkus Prize for nonfiction and was a finalist for the 2017 Pulitzer Prize for Biography or Autobiography.

== Synopsis ==
In 2004, Pulitzer Prize-winning journalist Susan Faludi learned that her 76-year-old estranged father had undergone sex reassignment surgery and now went by the name Stefánie. This revelation led Faludi to reunite with Stefánie in Hungary, and the memoir documents Faludi's subsequent investigation into her father's life, particularly the years Stefánie spent growing up as a Hungarian Jew during World War II. Faludi also examines her relationship with her father, her father's transition, and explores the issues of gender identity and discrimination.

== Reception ==
=== Critical response ===
In the Darkroom was critically acclaimed. The New York Times' Michelle Goldberg described the memoir as a "rich, arresting and ultimately generous investigation of [Faludi's] father", while The Guardian's Claire Harman called it a "remarkable, moving and courageous book". Also writing for The Guardian, Rachel Cooke concluded, "Faludi's book, reticent and elegant and extremely clever, will not be to everyone’s taste. But this doesn’t preclude it from being an out-and-out masterpiece of its kind."

NPR's Maureen Corrigan noted that the book "seems like especially pertinent reading in these, our own dark times, when questions of identity keep coming to the fore, as matters of life and death." Entertainment Weekly's Tina Jordan gave the memoir an "A−" rating, concluding: "It’s a gripping and honest personal journey—bolstered by reams of research—that ultimately transcends family and addresses much bigger questions of identity and reinvention." According to The New York Times' Jennifer Senior, Faludi "challenges some of our most fundamental assumptions about transsexuality", although The Washington Post's Hanna Rosin felt that Faludi "never quite completes" the "broader counter-narrative about identity" which she starts.

In a rare mediocre review, USA Today's Sharon Peters gave the book two stars out of four, concluding: "In the end, though, In the Darkroom fails to shed real light."

=== Accolades ===
In the Darkroom won the 2016 Kirkus Prize in the nonfiction category and was a finalist for the 2017 Pulitzer Prize for Biography or Autobiography. The book was also selected by the editors of The New York Times Book Review as one of the 10 Best Books of 2016. Laura Miller of Slate named it one of her 10 Favorite Books of 2016. In the Darkroom also found a wide international audience and has been translated into multiple foreign languages, including Spanish, Italian, German, Korean, Polish, Portuguese, Hungarian, Turkish, Dutch, and Chinese.
