= Sycamore Review =

American literary magazine

- Discipline: Literary magazine
- Language: English
- Edited by: Blake Chernin

Publication details
- History: 1988-2023
- Publisher: Purdue University (United States)
- Frequency: Biannual

Standard abbreviations
- ISO 4: Sycamore Rev.

Indexing
- ISSN: 1043-1497

Links
- Journal homepage

Sycamore Review was an American literary magazine based at Purdue University in West Lafayette, Indiana. It awarded Wabash Prizes for fiction and poetry. Henry Hughes was its first editor-in-chief, from 1988 to 1991. In late 2023, cuts to the English department at Purdue shut down the Sycamore Review.

== See also ==
- List of literary magazines
