= Stephen Emerson (author) =

American writer of fiction

- Born: 1950 (age 75–76); Sylva, North Carolina, U.S.
- Education: Duke University (BA); San Francisco State University (MA)
- Occupation: Writer
- Writing career
- Genre: Fiction

Stephen Emerson (born 1950 in Sylva, North Carolina), is an American writer of fiction and other prose.

== Life and work ==
Emerson wrote his early stories while at Duke University, where he met Robert Creeley, worked with novelist Reynolds Price, and wrote a directed thesis on Samuel Beckett. He then moved west and worked with novelists Wright Morris and Kay Boyle at San Francisco State University.

During the 1970s Emerson met several more of the writers he admired, forming influential friendships with Fielding Dawson and Edward Dorn, as well as Tom Raworth, Bill Berkson, Lucia Berlin, and Ted Pearson. A portion of his early novel The Wife appeared in New Directions in Prose and Poetry No. 37 (1978). His critical writings on Gilbert Sorrentino and Paul Bowles appeared in The Review of Contemporary Fiction. Additional work has appeared in Credences, Periodics, Zyzzyva, Rolling Stock, Hambone, and other small magazines.

Before returning to San Francisco in 1978, he lived in Bolinas, California, Anchorage, Alaska, and Key West, Florida. During the 1970s he worked as an automobile mechanic and an editor. Later, he was a freelancer in the advertising business. Emerson resides in Oakland, California.

== Selected publications ==
- Moon the Shirt and Pants Monopoly Man, (with Fielding Dawson), 1976, Shortstop Press (New York)
- The Lee Morgan Memorial Album, 1977, 100 Posters (New York)
- Semi-Tropical Hoopla, 1981, Vortex Editions (San Francisco)
- Neighbors] (stories), 1982, Tombouctou Books (Bolinas, CA)
- The Wife (novel), 1985, Long River Books (East Haven, CT)
- A Manual for Cleaning Women: Selected Stories of Lucia Berlin, (Editor, Introduction), 2015, Farrar, Straus & Giroux

Emerson holds a BA (French literature) from Duke and an MA (Creative Writing) from San Francisco State University

== Reviews ==
- Andrei Codrescu: Neighbors by Stephen Emerson, The Baltimore Sun, April 3, 1983
- Doug Lang: Neighbors by Stephen Emerson, Black Tickets and other books by Jayne Anne Philips, Washington Review, April–May 1983
- Editors of Rolling Stock: The Wife by Stephen Emerson, Rolling Stock #9, 1985
