= Euphoria (King novel) =

2014 novel by Lily King

- Author: Lily King
- Language: English
- Genre: Historical fiction
- Set in: 1930s Papua New Guinea
- Publisher: Atlantic Monthly Press
- Publication date: 2014
- Awards: Kirkus Prize for Fiction
- ISBN: 978-0-8021-2255-1

Euphoria is a 2014 historical fiction novel by American author Lily King. The book centers on the story of an anthropologist named Nell, who is loosely based on the life of Margaret Mead, and her husband living in New Guinea in the 1930s. They meet Bankson, another anthropologist, while in Australia, resulting in a tumultuous love triangle that is the book's central conflict.

King wrote the first draft of Euphoria entirely in pencil. She claimed it helped her feel less pressure to get it perfect on the first try. She originally wrote the novel to be in Nell's point of view, but realized she preferred the story in Bankson's instead.

== Inspiration ==
Margaret Mead was a cultural anthropologist in the early 20th century. King read a biography of Mead's life when she was doing fieldwork in Papua New Guinea with her second husband, Reo Fortune, and an English anthropologist, Gregory Bateson. This inspired her to write Euphoria.

On the topic, King said:

Their work and their feelings got all intertwined, and at one point they had this huge “breakthrough” that was all based around a rationalization of Mead’s and Bateson’s feelings for each other. That was all so fascinating to me, and of course when anything is fascinating to me I want to write about it, but that was an idea that seemed so outside my abilities — anthropology? 1933? PNG? crocodiles and cannibalism? — that I expected it to float off. But it didn’t.

King worked on research for the book from 2005-2011. She read Mead's memoir and works to learn more about her life. King also researched the tribes who live on the Sepik River of New Guinea, who Mead worked with closely. She decided to give the tribes in Euphoria fictional names, so as to not limit them to any one group.

== Principal Characters ==
Nell, a young female anthropologist based on Margaret Mead who recently became famous for a book she published on Samoan children (a reference to Mead's Coming of Age in Samoa).

Fen, Nell's husband, who is Australian and has a tendency to be violent. He treats her poorly, although the extent is not revealed until the end of the book. He is based on Mead's second husband.

Bankson, a shy British anthropologist who is in love with Nell. His older brothers and father have all died, and his mother anxiously writes him for updates from his fieldwork. He narrates most of the novel, and he is based on Mead's third husband.

Helen, Nell's friend and previous lover. She gives Bankson Nell's diary after she passes.

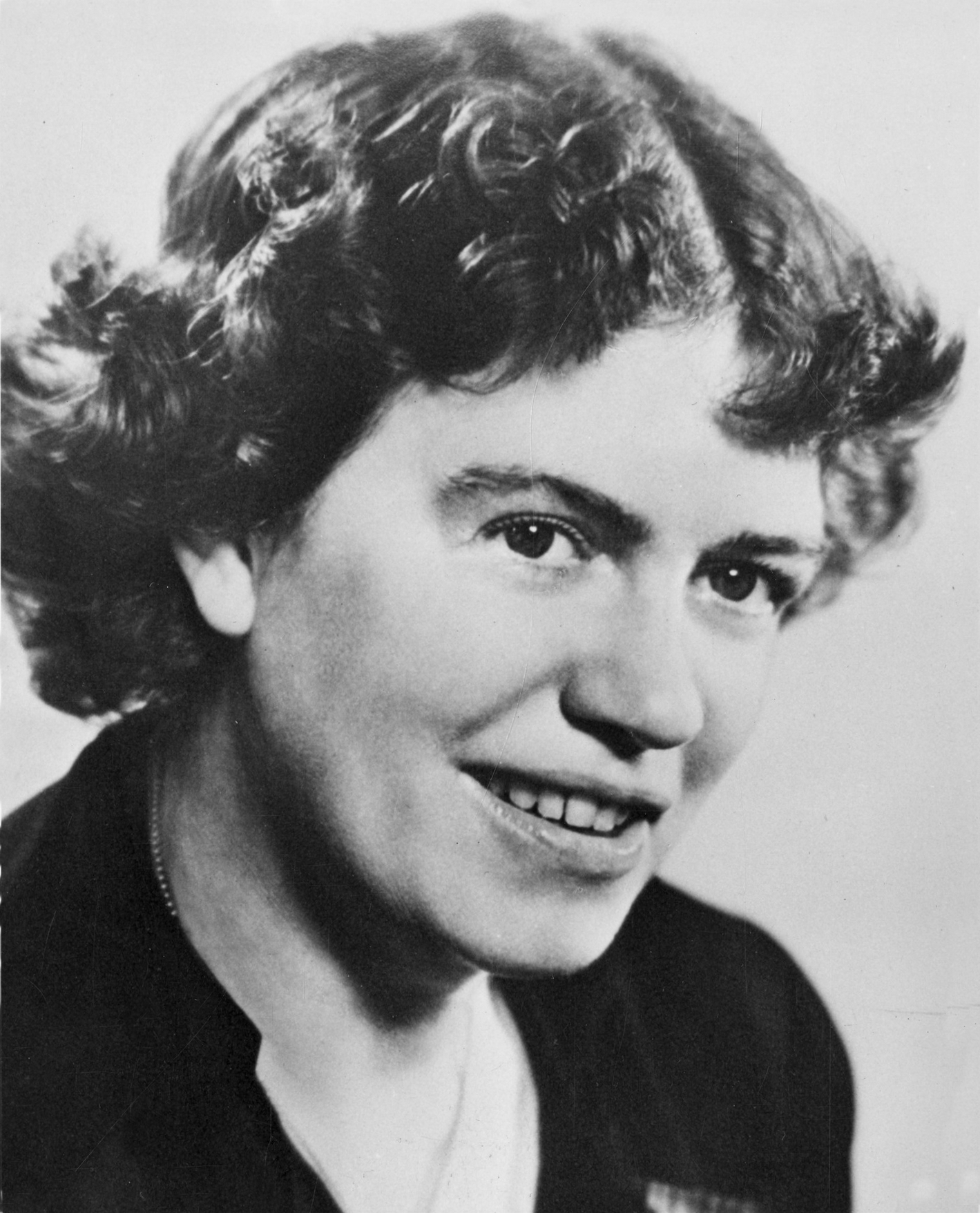
Margaret Mead, the inspiration for the character of Nell

== Synopsis ==
Nell and Fen are anthropologists finishing up fieldwork on the fictional Mumbanyo tribe in New Guinea in the interwar period. They are about to leave when they meet Bankson, a lonely anthropologist who convinces them to come with him back to his fieldwork site. There, Bankson introduces them to a new tribe, the Tam, a few hours down the river from his, for them to study.

Nell wants a baby, and suffers multiple miscarriages during this time. Fen is charismatic, yet violent, and quickly learns the tribe's language. Bankson visits them after a few weeks to see how they are doing, and he admits to himself he is in love with Nell. While there, he suffers a seizure and falls ill. Fen takes care of him in the meantime.

Towards the end of the novel, Fen runs off with a local boy in search of a flute artifact. Nell and Bankson confess their feelings to one another. When Fen returns, the boy has been killed, and Bankson realizes they must leave immediately. The three reluctantly leave to Sydney, where Nell and Fen return to America. Bankson asks Nell to stay, but she denies. Later, after thinking about reuniting with Nell, Bankson discovers she had died on the boat to New York, under dubious circumstances.

== Awards ==
- 2014 Kirkus Award for Fiction winner
- 2014 National Book Critics Circle Award finalist
- 2014 New England Book Award for Fiction winner
