= Backlash: The Undeclared War Against American Women =

1991 book by Susan Faludi

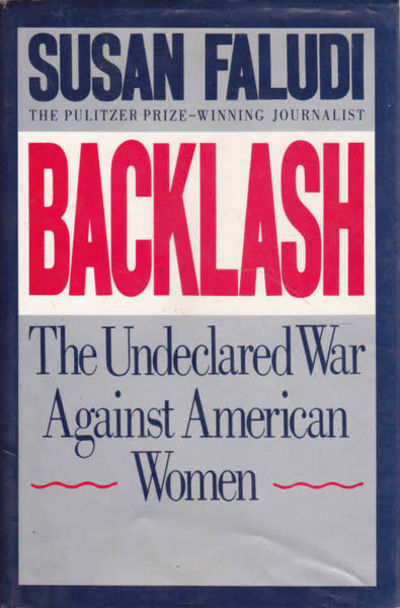
- Cover of the first edition
- Author: Susan Faludi
- Language: English
- Subject: Feminism in the United States
- Published: 1991
- Publisher: Crown Publishing Group
- Publication place: United States
- Media type: Print (hardback and paperback)
- Pages: 552
- ISBN: 978-0-517-57698-4

Backlash: The Undeclared War Against American Women is a 1991 book by Susan Faludi, in which the author presents evidence demonstrating the existence of a media-driven "backlash" against the feminist advances of the 1970s in the United States.

Faludi argues that the backlash uses a strategy of "blaming the victim", which suggests that the women's liberation movement itself is the cause of many of the problems alleged to be plaguing American women in the late 1980s. She also argues that many of these problems are illusory, constructed by the media without reliable evidence.

Faludi also identifies backlash as an historical trend, recurring when women have made substantial gains in their efforts to obtain equal rights. The book won the National Book Critics Circle Award for Nonfiction in 1991. A 15th anniversary edition was released in 2006.

== Context ==
Backlash is a 550 page analysis of the social, economic and political inequities and resulting difficulties American women faced in the 1980s. The book was hailed as "..the most vehement and unapologetic call to arms to issue from the feminist camp in many years," and "..a rich compendium of fascinating information and an indictment of a system losing its grip" that "..has already done much to ignite a revolutionary 'national' consciousness." Published within a year of several other high-profile feminist works; Naomi Wolf's “The Beauty Myth”(1990), Gloria Steinem's “Revolution from Within” (1992), and Marilyn French's “The War Against Women” (1992), Faludi's book garnered front page attention in national newspapers and magazines, and interviews of its author on television and radio. As a best-seller, Backlash rejuvenated feminist discussion in the media, and established Faludi as a leading spokesperson for women's issues in the 1990s.

== Synopsis ==
=== Introduction – Blame it on Feminism ===
The main premise of the book is that there are two overarching media messages regarding feminism's gains for women since the 1980s: the feminist fight for equality has largely been won, and now that women have this equality they have never been so miserable (ix). Faludi contends that women are not yet equal and there is a counter-assault to halt or reverse their hard-won gains in the quest for equality. By reporting statistically unsupported ideas of how feminism has negatively affected women, the media has helped to create a 'backlash' that encourages women to reject the gains and the struggle for real equality. Reports of "the man-shortage", "the infertility epidemic", "female burnout", and "toxic day-care" are not the actual conditions of women's lives, but are false images portrayed by the media, popular culture and advertising.(xv)

=== Part One – Myths and Flashbacks ===
This section documents the statistics that form the backdrop of myths about women being more unhappy in their lives now. Faludi presents counter-evidence to several media myths which include: that there is a shortage of potential spouses for women; that new no-fault divorce laws are negatively affecting women's finances; that professional and career women are increasingly infertile and have more mental illnesses than their non-working counterparts; and that working women's reliance on daycare subjects their children to permanent adverse effects academically, socially and emotionally. Faludi argues that none of these are true.

She also charts the occurrence of similar backlashes in American history, focusing on the women's movements of the Victorian era and after – the late 1840s, and the early 1900s, 1940s and 1970s. She shows that the same media reporting of adverse effects was present in each of these eras, as well as the same pressure to reverse women's gains. She quotes American scholar Ann Douglas, "The progress of women's rights in our culture, unlike other types of 'progress', has always been strangely reversible." (46)

=== Part Two – The Backlash in Popular Culture ===
This section describes the media delivery of a backlash through the reporting of 'trends'; the evidence of a counter-assault on feminism in Hollywood's portrayal of women in the 1980s; television's projection of the backlash in its changing roles for women; the change of focus in the fashion industry from the business suits of the 1970s to 'feminine' and impractical lingerie in the 1980s; and the cosmetic industry's emphasis on unnaturally accentuating features and its promotion of cosmetic surgery.

Faludi describes 'trend journalism" of the 1980s, where newspaper articles gained authority through repetition rather than evidence-based reporting (79). Reporting on trends such as "cocooning ", "the new abstinence", "the new femininity", "the new morality" and "the new celibacy" pretended to be about facts while offering none. Trend stories contradicted each other, and served a political agenda by implying women's experiences had nothing to do with political events or social pressures (81). She also discusses the change in Hollywood's screen images of women from the 1970s independent single women to the epitome of anti-feminist sentiment in the vengeful and frightening portrayal of a single career woman in the 1980s movie Fatal Attraction.

Although less virulent than Hollywood, television toned down the strong independence of women in 1970s shows such as The Mary Tyler Moore Show and The Bionic Woman, returning actress Mary Tyler Moore to the 1980s screen as a burned out divorcee with a bleak career and existence in the short-lived Mary (157) and cancelling its extremely popular and award-winning series Cagney & Lacey because the characters were "inordinately abrasive, loud, and lacking warmth."(152). According to Faludi, a "good" female character was Hope, the angelic stay-at-home mother in the series Thirtysomething, who was envied by her careerist female friends.

Faludi describes the fashion and cosmetic industries "little girl" clothing designs and the emphasis on frills, flounces and "feminising" as an eruption of resentment by the fashion industry towards the increasingly independent buying habits of female shoppers. Rising prices caused a "fashion revolt" by women who would not do what the industry told them to do and the industry replied with corsets and bustiers. Faludi argues that "[i]n every backlash, the fashion industry has produced punitively restrictive clothing and the fashion press has demanded that women wear them."(173)

The harsh beauty standards of the late 1980s are also detailed, describing the pressure on women to look young when past their youth, and the promotion of cosmetic surgery as a means to this end.

=== Part Three – Origins of a Reaction: Backlash Movers, Shakers, and Thinkers ===
This section deals with the "New Right" movement and its pro-family, although anti-feminist, agenda; the Reagan presidency and its reversal of feminist gains of the 1970s; and the mainstream thinkers and writers whose views encouraged the public acceptance of the backlash. Faludi discusses the New Right's intention to "turn the clock back to 1954" and their articulation of the idea that women's equality is responsible for women's unhappiness (230). She traces the rise of the New Right and their attacks on feminists and the Equal Rights Amendment, and describes how some of the most politically active anti-feminist women of these organizations were actually benefiting from feminist ideas of self-determination, equality and freedom of choice (256).

Feminism's fortune under the Reagan administration is examined, and the drop in numbers of women in federal office, as well as the decline in federal programs that supported women's equality during those years, indicates it did not fare well. By the end of the decade, one survey found, the National Organization for Women (NOW) were the political body the majority of women felt represented their interests best – better than either the Republican or the Democratic parties. NOW might have formed a third party but for the outrage, anger and derision this idea drew from the media and press (277).

Faludi also profiles nine men and women, some anti-feminist, and some neutral, but all "the backlash's emissaries" for their views and positions in the mainstream media: George Gilder, Allan Bloom, Michael and Margarita Levin, Warren Farrell, Robert Bly, Sylvia Ann Hewlett, Betty Friedan, and Carol Gilligan. Faludi's avowed intent in these cameos is to illustrate the less recognized factors, from professional grievances to domestic strain, that may have influenced their approach to feminist concerns (283).

=== Part Four – Backlashings: The Effects on Women's Minds, Jobs, and Bodies ===
This section deals with the fallout of self-help books directed toward women; the misinformation and disinformation campaign of the Reagan administration regarding women's loss of status in the workplace; and the conservative attempt to reverse the legislation that legalized abortion (Roe v. Wade).

Faludi outlines the views of popular psychology books urging women to understand all the reactions of the backlash as originating in themselves. (337) According to Faludi, self-help manuals of the 1980s suggested women's power was rooted in surrender and submission to their men, and she argues that the 1980s therapy books "blot out the most basic premise of feminist therapy – that both social and personal growth are important, necessary, and mutually reinforcing." (338) In 1985, the American Psychiatric Association (APA) added "premenstrual dysphoric disorder" (PMS) and "masochistic personality disorder" to the Diagnostic and Statistical Manual of Mental Disorders (the DSM), thereby, Faludi asserts, causing women's fluctuating hormone levels and socially enforced pleasing of others to become diagnostically determined illnesses (362).

An increased difference in the average pay of men and women, and falling rates of women's employment opportunities and job promotions, were facts downplayed or ignored by the Reagan administration, while the media reported corporate claims of record highs in jobs and promotions for women (363). Faludi reports statistical evidence of a decline in job status and an increasingly sex-segregated work force, with wages for women falling throughout the 1980s, all areas in which the media claimed the opposite. She also describes sharply contracting opportunities for women in journalism, the retail industry, and skilled blue-collar jobs.

Finally, Faludi relates the story of Randall Terry, the founder of Operation Rescue, an activist anti-abortion group, and discusses the unspoken subtext of the right-to-life campaign: the shifting of the balance of sexual power and "the patriarch's eclipsed ability to make the family decisions" (403). Faludi states that the rate of abortion has not increased significantly over the past 100 years, but that legalization has increased the safety of the women choosing the procedure. She charts the increase in the rights of the fetus and decline in the rights of the mother through the 1970s and 1980s, and describes how at least fifteen of America's largest corporations drafted "fetal protection policies", which effectively excluded women, pregnant or not, from higher paying jobs that involved exposure to chemicals or radiation (437).

=== Epilogue ===
Faludi concludes by suggesting that although the 1980s was a decade that "produced one long, painful and unremitting campaign to thwart women's progress", women pushed back. She states that although there have been periodic attempts to reverse women's gains, women have resisted, although she wonders how effective the resistance of the 1980s has been, claiming women seemed unaware of their real political power and vitality in that decade, and missed an opportunity to make a "great leap forward" (459).

=== Preface to the 2006, 15th anniversary edition ===
Faludi believes that although there is no longer a backlash, this may not be a good thing. She notes that we are being told that feminism's goals have been achieved, and young women no longer need to identify as feminists(x). Through the 1990s women made political and economical headway that brought them closer to equal representation and pay, but Faludi believes it is a distorted view of feminism that is present in mainstream America today. She claims feminism has been co-opted by commercialism, and economic independence has become buying power; self-determination has become commodified self-improvement of "physical appearance, self-esteem and the fool's errand of reclaiming one's youth"; and public agency has been transformed to publicity (xv). Faludi says we have yet to find our way to the "more meaningful goals of social change, responsible citizenship, the advancement of human creativity, [and] the building of a mature and vital public world." Her concern is that our social structure and cultural ideology have not fundamentally changed, saying, "We have used our gains to gild our shackles, but not break them."(xvi).

== Publication ==
Faludi was inspired to write Backlash after investigating the statistics behind a 1986 Newsweek cover story that reported on a Harvard–Yale study detailing the bleak marital prospects for single, educated career women. The statistics were in error and did not reflect the reality, so Faludi began to examine other sensationalized stories about women that were being promoted by the media. She believes that her book started to attract the attention it did because women relegated to – and writing for – the arts and culture sections of journals and newspapers, frustrated with internal job discrimination and believing the book addressed the problem, helped to get initial coverage. Faludi also says the 1991 fall publishing date was an advantage because during the originally planned spring date "we were in the middle of a war, it was boys' time" and the book "would have dropped like a stone", whereas the "fall was girls' time because of Anita Hill." Additionally, two publishing companies, Crown Publishing Group (Faludi's Backlash) and Little, Brown and Company (Gloria Steinem's Revolution From Within) made an unusual decision to promote the two books together, which proved commercially successful in heightening attention for the authors, the books, and the subject matter. Faludi and Steinem were together on the cover of Time, in ads, in interviews and in the "reams of commentary on both books". Backlash has also been translated into several foreign languages, including Spanish, Portuguese, Polish, German, Finnish, Korean, and Italian.

== Public and critical response ==
In the editorial opinion pages of newspapers and magazines, Backlash drew strong and conflicting responses. While Faludi was accused of "sulking on the bestseller lists" and ignoring the gains of the women's movement, elsewhere she was hailed as "the best thinker of the year", "a crackerjack interviewer." One reviewer claims Faludi "builds a well researched and carefully documented case", while another thinks she "skews data, misquotes primary sources and makes serious errors of omission". Paul Shore, in the Humanist, writes that Backlash has done "more than any other recent work [...] to compel us to see the forces controlling and crippling women for what they really are: forces working against the interests of everyone." Peggy Phelan, writing for American Literary History, points out that Faludi, having faith in her own statistical analysis data, does not account for the partiality and distortions of statistics, and Phelan says "[o]ne cannot both attack 'bad' numbers and neutrally present 'good' numbers." Responding to such criticism, Nancy Gibbs, a journalist with Time magazine, suggested that "the big picture is there, and the big picture is accurate."

=== Race, class and gender criticism ===
In a review of Backlash for The Nation, Gayle Greene discusses Faludi's documenting of factory closures, the move to a service oriented economy and the millions of lost jobs for blue-collar workers. She says "Faludi's analysis accounts for not only anti-feminism but for the resurgence of racism and explains why the most virulent expressions of both have tended to come from those hurting from social and economic dislocation."

In contrast, Peggy Phelan, writing for American Literary History, says "Faludi's 'America' is emphatically white and heterosexual" and points out the overwhelming use of white, middle-class people in Backlash's examples. Interview participants and detailed anecdotes are of whites, while people of color are only mentioned as statistical categories. She accuses Faludi of forgetting race as a statistical signifier, and also of failing to consider and connect sexism, race, and homophobia in her analysis. Phelan finds these to be "shocking omissions in a 'feminist' manifesto for the nineties" and believes it reveals the "real target audience is the very mainstream media market [Faludi] relentlessly critiques." Mary Eberstadt is critical of what she perceives to be Faludi's hypocrisy, saying that as a successful woman with a Harvard education she is condescending toward poor and working-class people in her descriptions of them in Backlash.

=== Conservative criticism ===
Reviewers writing from conservative perspectives were concerned with what they understood to be Faludi's endorsement of single-minded feminist interests at the expense of traditional family values. Maggie Gallagher, writing for the National Review, claims "the biggest danger facing us today comes not from discrimination in the workplace but from the collapse of the family", while Mary Eberstadt claims the women's movement, and Backlash, chronically do not address the fact of women having husbands and children. Gloria Steinem suggests that talking about "family" rather than "women's" issues "renders women invisible", and Faludi says that "all family issues should not be women's issues... they should be human issues. To confound feminism and family promotes the idea that women only exist when they have husbands and children."

=== Influence ===
Writing from a legal perspective, Rebecca Eisenberg of the Harvard Law Review, says of Faludi's book that "[a]lthough written for the general public, Backlash can benefit the legal community as well. Faludi's incisive accounts of women's lives provide a meaningful and accurate basis for legal redress of social inequality". She feels when the status quo is seen by the judicial system to be a result of gender hierarchy, "the many ways in which the law ignores the reality of women's lives" will become apparent, and the "affirmative transformation of the legal system becomes a reasonable step towards equality." In Backlash, Faludi points out that among industrialized nations, only the United States has not institutionalized basic child care and leave for working parents. Of this, Eisenberg says "there is virtually no case law on the inequality of depriving women of equal opportunities to balance both a family and a career" by this failure to provide necessary childcare or parental leave. Praising Faludi's "tenacious investigative journalism" as well as her anecdotal writing and personal interviews, Eisenberg says "her snapshots of women's experiences provide a basis for realistic analysis of the legal status quo."

== See also ==
- Third-wave feminism
