= The Turner House =

2015 novel by Angela Flournoy

- First edition
- Author: Angela Flournoy
- Language: English
- Genre: Historical fiction
- Set in: Detroit
- Publisher: Houghton Mifflin Harcourt
- Publication date: 2015
- Publication place: United States
- Pages: 320
- ISBN: 978-0-544-30316-4
- OCLC: 971095526
- Website: Official website

The Turner House is a 2015 debut novel by Angela Flournoy. The novel was shortlisted for the National Book Award for Fiction and won the VCU Cabell First Novelist Award.

== Background ==
Though Flournoy's father's family is originally from Detroit, she had not lived in the city. She did considerable research to be able to depict the different 20th century periods of life in Detroit as seen in the novel.

== Plot ==
The novel tells the story of a Detroit family with 13 children as it responds to the economic woes of the city, in both the 1940s, and then in 2008. The house that sees the changes in the family, also becomes a character in the family's saga.

== Style ==
Flournoy gives considerable tribute to Zora Neale Hurston as an inspiration for her work, and reviewers made comparison of the novel to works like Hurston's Mules and Men.

== Reception ==
The novel received strong positive reviews. Kirkus Reviews wrote that "Flournoy’s writing is precise and sharp, and despite several loose ends [...] the novel draws readers to the Turner family almost magnetically." The Nation reviewer Hannah K. Gold focused on how the novel successfully explores the dispossessed African American family, and praises the novel writing that it is "a story transformed by intragenerational retelling rather than passed down. It’s quick and dirty mythmaking." Writing at The New York Times, Matthew Thomas called The Turner House a "assured and memorable novel."

BuzzFeed reported that The Turner House enjoyed strong sales in addition to positive critical reception: "According to Bookscan, which tracks around 70% of U.S. book sales, her book has sold over 15,000 copies in paperback and hardcover as of April [2016]; anything over 10,000 is generally considered high for literary fiction."

== Awards ==
Year	Award	Category	Result	Ref.
2015	Barnes & Noble Discover Great New Writers Award	Fiction	Shortlisted	
2015	Center for Fiction First Novel Prize	—	Shortlisted	
2015	National Book Award	Fiction	Finalist	
2016	BCALA Literary Awards	First Novel	Won	
2016	Hurston/Wright Legacy Award	Fiction	Longlisted	
2016	NAACP Image Awards	Debut Author	Shortlisted	
2016	Paterson Fiction Prize	—	Won	
2016	PEN/Robert W. Bingham Prize	—	Shortlisted	
2016	VCU Cabell First Novelist Award	—	Won	
2016	Young Lions Fiction Award	—	Finalist	
2017	International Dublin Literary Award	—	Longlisted	
