= Marja-Liisa Plats =

Estonian illustrator

Marja-Liisa Plats (born 16 December 1984) is an Estonian illustrator, graphic designer, photographer, and singer.

She graduated from Tartu Art College in photography.

She has illustrated over 40 children's books. She has listed twice in White Ravens catalogue.

She is a member of Young Authors' Association in Tartu and Tartu Artists' Union.
