= Angela Flournoy =

American writer

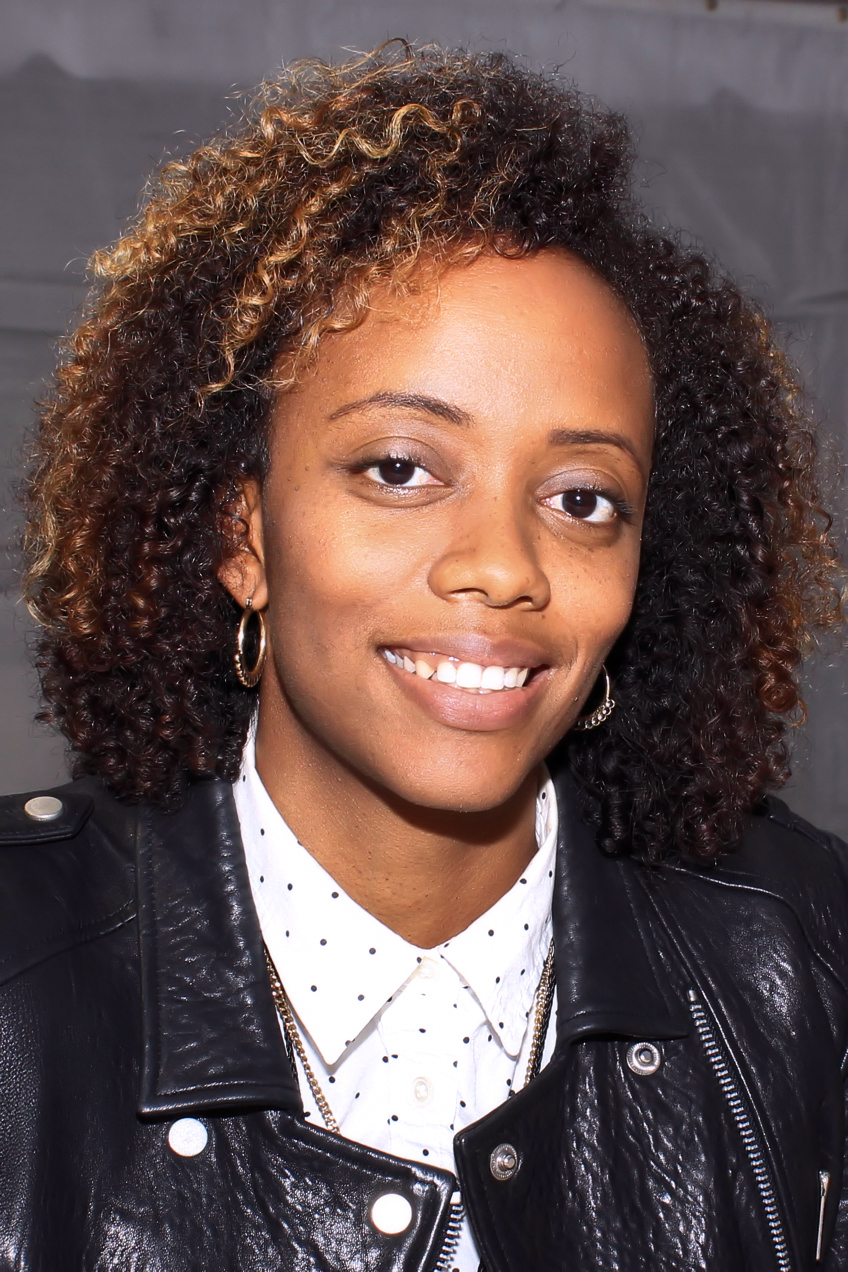
- Flournoy at the 2016 Texas Book Festival
- Education: University of Southern California (BA); Iowa Writers' Workshop (MFA)
- Writing career
- Notable works: The Turner House (2015); The Wilderness (2025)
- Notable awards: 5 Under 35 Honoree (2015); First Novelist Award (2016); NEA Fellowship (2018)
- Website: angelaflournoy.com

Angela Flournoy is an American writer. Her debut novel, The Turner House, won the VCU Cabell First Novelist Award and was shortlisted for the National Book Award for Fiction. Flourney was named a National Book Foundation 5 Under 35 Honoree in 2015, nominated by her former teacher ZZ Packer.

== Early life and education ==
Flournoy was raised in Southern California by a mother from Los Angeles and a father from Detroit. She attended the University of Southern California originally as a journalism major, but she quickly switched to English. She later attended the Iowa Writers' Workshop, where she received the Dean's Fellowship. Flournoy started developing her first novel, The Turner House, while attending the Iowa Workshop and frequently traveling to Detroit to visit her father's family.

== Career ==
After graduating, Flournoy taught writing for the University of Iowa, Trinity Washington University, and the DC Public Library. She has also taught for The New School, Columbia University, Princeton University, Warren Wilson College, and University of California at Los Angeles.

She published her debut novel, The Turner House, in 2015. The New York Times called it "an engrossing and remarkably mature first novel [...] assured and memorable." It won the VCU Cabell First Novelist Award and was shortlisted for the National Book Award for Fiction. It was also shortlisted for the PEN/Robert W. Bingham Prize for Debut Fiction and nominated for an NAACP Image Award. The novel was shortlisted for the 2015 Center for Fiction First Novel Prize and a finalist for the 2016 Young Lions Fiction Award. It was named a "Notable Book of 2015" by the New York Times.

BuzzFeed described Flournoy as "the most lauded debut novelist in America," noting her many awards and honors, as well as The Turner House's strong sales: "According to Bookscan, which tracks around 70% of U.S. book sales, her book has sold over 15,000 copies in paperback and hardcover as of April [2016]; anything over 10,000 is generally considered high for literary fiction."

Flournoy was the 2016-17 Rona Jaffe Foundation Fellow at the New York Public Library's Cullman Center for Scholars and Writers. She was awarded a 2018 National Endowment for the Arts fellowship, and was a 2019 Mary Ellen von der Heyden fellow in fiction at the American Academy in Berlin.

In 2020, she was scheduled to go on a State Department-sponsored reading tour of Germany. Flournoy canceled at short notice amid US tensions with Iran and published a justification in The New Yorker.

Flournoy attributes her understanding of character development to Zora Neale Hurston's Mules and Men.

Her second novel, The Wilderness, was published in 2025 by Mariner Books. In a starred review, Kirkus Reviews called it "Elegant and unsettling, this novel evades the expected at every turn." The book was longlisted for the 2025 National Book Award for Fiction and the 2026 Aspen Words Literary Prize. It was a finalist for the 2025 National Book Critics Circle Award for Fiction and the 2025 Kirkus Prize for Fiction.

== Works ==
=== Novels ===
- The Turner House. Houghton Mifflin Harcourt. 2015. ISBN 9780544303164.
- The Wilderness. Mariner Books. 2025. ISBN 9780063318779.
