= Luster (novel) =

2020 debut novel by Raven Leilani

- Author: Raven Leilani
- Language: English
- Genre: literary fiction
- Published: August 4, 2020
- Publisher: Farrar, Straus and Giroux
- Publication place: United States
- Media type: Print (hardcover) and digital
- Pages: 240 (hardcover)
- ISBN: 978-0-374-19432-1 (1st ed Hardcover)
- OCLC: 1119744688

Luster is a 2020 debut novel by Raven Leilani. It follows a young black woman who gets involved with a middle-aged white man in an open marriage. Luster was released on August 4, 2020 by Farrar, Straus and Giroux. It received mainly positive critical reception. It was awarded the 2020 Kirkus Prize for fiction, the 2020 Center for Fiction First Novel Prize, and the 2020 John Leonard Prize from the National Book Critics Circle Awards, among others.

In December 2020, Literary Hub said the novel made 16 lists of the year's best books.

== Plot ==
Luster follows Edie, a black woman in her twenties who lives in New York City and works as an editorial assistant. She meets Eric, a white man in his forties who is in an open marriage. Eric and his wife, Rebecca, have a 12-year-old adoptive daughter, Akila, who is also Black. Edie begins a sexual relationship with Eric and moves to New Jersey to live with his family after she gets fired.

== Critical reception ==
The book was recommended by various outlets prior to its publication.

Kirkus Reviews described the book in a starred review as "Sharp, strange, propellant—and a whole lot of fun." Mark Athitakis rated the book 3.5/4 stars and stated in USA Today, "Luster isn’t just a sardonic book, but a powerful one about emotional transformation." Publishers Weekly reviewed the book and stated, "Edie’s ability to navigate the complicated relationships with the Walkers exhibits Leilani’s mastery of nuance, and the narration is perceptive, funny, and emotionally charged." Bookpage.com gave Luster a starred review and wrote: "Leilani’s writing is cerebral and raw, and this debut novel will establish her as a powerful new voice."

Noting that the novel is a debut, Leah Greenblatt of EW wrote, "that newness sometimes shows; after a wildly beguiling start, the novel telescopes inward, often forsaking narrative momentum for mood and color. Sentence by sentence, though, she’s also a phenomenal writer, her dense, dazzling paragraphs shot through with self-effacing wit and psychological insight." Writing for Virginia Quarterly Review, Kaitlyn Greenidge praised Leilani's "linguistic skill."

== Publication ==
- 2020, United States, Farrar, Straus and Giroux ISBN 978-0-374-19432-1, Publication date 4 August 2020, hardcover.

== Adaptation ==
In October 2021, it was reported that a television series adaptation of the novel was in development at HBO. The project will be produced by Gaumont International Television and Tessa Thompson's Viva Maude with Thompson and Kishori Rajan executive producing.

== Awards and nominations ==
- Winner, 2020 Kirkus Prize for Fiction
- Winner, 2020 Center for Fiction First Novel Prize
- Winner, 2020 John Leonard Prize
- Longlist, 2021 Andrew Carnegie Medal for Excellence in Fiction
- Winner, 2021 VCU Cabell First Novelist Award
- Winner, 2021 Dylan Thomas Prize
