= A Guardian and a Thief =

2025 novel by Megha Majumdar

- Author: Megha Majumdar
- Language: English
- Genre: Literary fiction
- Set in: Near-future Kolkata
- Publisher: Knopf
- Publication date: 2025
- Pages: 224
- ISBN: 9780593804889

A Guardian and a Thief is a 2025 novel by Indian author Megha Majumdar set in a climate-stricken, near-future India. The novel tells two stories over the course of a week: that of a family in Kolkata trying to immigrate to the United States, and that of a young thief who steals their climate visas while looking for food. It deals with themes like morality, climate change, and loyalty.

== Inspiration ==
Majumdar has said that she was inspired to write a story about her hometown of Kolkata, India, which is impacted severely by climate change. In an interview with The Harvard Gazette, Majumdar recalls a time she was going to the movie theater in Kolkata and it was so hot that the tar on the roads stuck to her feet.

Majumdar also wanted to deal with the issue of defining morality. In an interview with the Women's Prize for Fiction, Majumdar said she wanted to explore the question: "When an adult steals an orange from a child to feed their own child, is that an erosion of their humanity or the most uninhibited expression of who they are?"

The story is also about immigration. When Majumdar was 19, she moved to the United States from Kolkata to go to university. She has said in an interview with India Currents that this experience helped her shape the story of A Guardian and a Thief.

== Process ==
Majumdar said she took six years to write A Guardian and a Thief. Originally, the book was going to follow a young child navigating a dystopian world. However, in 2021, after having her son, Majumdar realized she wanted to write a book about motherhood in the climate crisis, ultimately influencing the "emotional core" of the novel.

On the topic of writing about children in tough situations, Majumdar said:

Conjuring characters is a work of both putting emotional truth into a character and imagining pressure placed upon the characters, which far exceeds what I have gone through. It’s drawing from my experience and imagining what I have not experienced. But even if the question is difficult or the subject matter is grim, there is a kind of fundamental pleasure in thinking about those things. It’s what draws me to the page.

Majumdar's previous book, A Burning, was considered a large success. Majumdar has said that this made her more confident in her abilities while writing A Guardian and a Thief, although she also wished to write a book that was more complex and improved for her second novel.

== Principal characters ==
- Ma manages a homeless shelter in Kolkata. She plans to join her husband, Babu, in Ann Arbor, Michigan with her father, Dadu, and her daughter Misthi.
- Dadu is Ma's elderly father. He lives with Ma currently in their apartment in Kolkata, and is privately worried about leaving his city for a new country he hardly knows.
- Mishti is Babu's and Ma's 2-year-old daughter. She lives with Ma in their apartment in Kolkata.
- Boomba is a 20-year-old homeless young man who stays at the shelter that Ma operates. He steals Ma's, Dadu's, and Mishti's passports when he breaks into their apartment looking for food.
- Babu works in Ann Arbor, Michigan researching mosquito-borne diseases. He is waiting for his wife, father-in-law, and daughter to come join him in the United States on climate visas, unaware of the obstacles they are going through.

== Synopsis ==
In a near-future India devastated by climate change induced famine, Ma, a woman living in Kolkata, must survive seven days until she and her family can join her husband in the United States. Their passports, including their climate visas, are stolen by a young man, Boomba, when he breaks into their home for food. Later, Ma confronts Boomba, who blackmails her about the food she steals from the homeless shelter for her family. He promises to help look for their passports if she lets him and his family move into their apartment after they leave for the U.S.

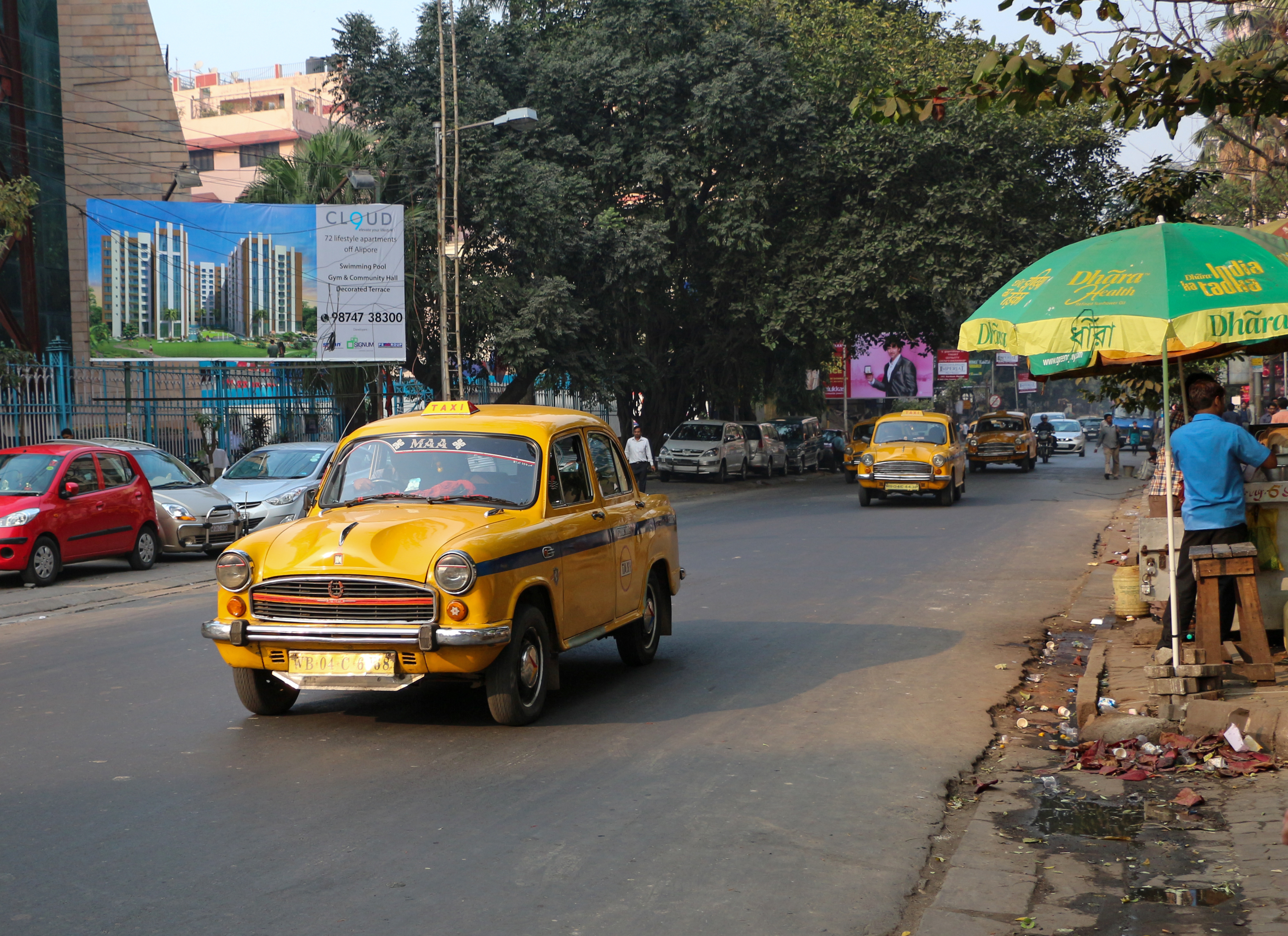
A taxi on the streets of Kolkata

Ma, Boomba, and Dadu's search for the passports is unsuccessful, and Ma and Dadu decide to get forged passports instead. Ma omits the truth of the situation to her husband on their phone calls. Later, Boomba temporarily abducts Mishti so he can gain entry into a feast held by a billionaire in Kolkata. Ma and Dadu are very anxious, and when Boomba returns Mishti, Dadu hits him. Boomba flees. The older man is troubled and eventually passes away later that night from natural causes.

Ma gets Dadu's remains cremated and picks up the forged passports. She discovers that she was scammed after the ink begins to run on the page. Before she gives up entirely, a man who knows Dadu knocks on their door to return the crumpled passports he found outside. Ma takes Mishti to the airport, and is dismayed to discover that there are world-wide protests against climate refugees entering America, so her flight has been indefinitely cancelled.

Ma returns home to find Boomba moved in to her apartment with his family. She becomes agitated and fights Boomba's father, who fatally strikes her. Boomba notices young Mishti and takes her into his home to protect her.

== Reception ==
In a starred review, Kirkus Reviews wrote that Majumdar's "electrifying depiction of dignity and morality under siege reveals the horror hidden by the bland term 'climate change'." Similarly, a starred review for Publishers Weekly called the novel "a luminous story...[that] proves once again that Majumdar is a master of the moral dilemma."

A judge for the National Book Award said that Majumdar "deftly portrays a world where people struggle to survive poverty, violence, scarcity, and climate disaster—and yet she manages to ultimately remind us of the power of the ties that bind and the beauty of storytelling."

A critic wrote that the novel "sometimes feels a little too neatly arranged, which can make the story edge closer to allegory than lived experience." Writing for the New York Times, Lily Meyer says "occasionally [A Guardian and a Thief] gets didactic, and its ending is simply too eventful to have much impact."

Ron Charles of The Washington Post called the book "a perfect short novel: 200 pages of tightly honed panic about life in a collapsing society."

== Awards ==
- Finalist for the 2025 National Book Award for Fiction.
- Oprah's Book Club pick
- Listed on Time magazine's 100 Must-Read Books of 2025
- Long listed for the 2025 Women's Prize for Fiction
