= Andrew Carnegie Medals for Excellence in Fiction and Nonfiction =

Awards for best fiction and nonfiction books for adult readers published in the U.S

- Awarded for: Best adult fiction & non-fiction
- Sponsored by: Carnegie Corporation (main sponsor); Booklist (ALA co-sponsor); Reference and User Services Association (ALA co-sponsor)
- Location: ALA annual conference
- Country: USA
- Presented by: American Library Association
- Hosted by: American Library Association
- Rewards: $5,000 (winner) $1,500 (finalists)
- First award: 2012
- Website: www.ala.org/awardsgrants/carnegieadult

The Andrew Carnegie Medals for Excellence in Fiction and Nonfiction were established in 2012 to recognize the best fiction and nonfiction books for adult readers published in the U.S. in the previous year. They are named in honor of nineteenth-century American philanthropist Andrew Carnegie in recognition of his deep belief in the power of books and learning to change the world.

The award is supported by the Carnegie Corporation of New York and administered by the American Library Association (ALA). Booklist and the Reference and User Services Association (RUSA) cosponsor the awards. The shortlist and winners are selected by a seven-member selection committee of library experts who work with adult readers. The annually appointed selection committee includes a chair, three Booklist editors or contributors, and three former members of RUSA CODES Notable Books Council.

The winners, one each for fiction and nonfiction, are announced at an event in June at the American Library Association Annual Conference; winning authors receive a $5,000 cash award, and two finalists in each category receive $1,500.

== Winners and finalists ==
=== Fiction ===
Winners and finalists in fiction
Year	Winner	Work	Finalists	Ref.
2012	Anne Enright	The Forgotten Waltz	Winner	
2012	Russell Banks	Lost Memory of Skin	Finalist	
2012	Karen Russell	Swamplandia!	Finalist	
2013	Richard Ford	Canada	Winner	
2013	Junot Díaz	This Is How You Lose Her	Finalist	
2013	Louise Erdrich	The Round House	Finalist	
2014	Donna Tartt	The Goldfinch	Winner	
2014	Chimamanda Ngozi Adichie	Americanah	Finalist	
2014	Edwidge Danticat	Claire of the Sea Light	Finalist	
2015	Anthony Doerr	All the Light We Cannot See	Winner	
2015	Chang-Rae Lee	On Such a Full Sea	Finalist	
2015	Colm Tóibín	Nora Webster	Finalist	
2016	Viet Thanh Nguyen	The Sympathizer	Winner	
2016	Jim Shepard	The Book of Aron	Finalist	
2016	Hanya Yanagihara	A Little Life	Finalist	
2017	Colson Whitehead	The Underground Railroad	Winner	
2017	Michael Chabon	Moonglow	Finalist	
2017	Zadie Smith	Swing Time	Finalist	
2018	Jennifer Egan	Manhattan Beach	Winner	
2018	Jesmyn Ward	Sing, Unburied, Sing	Finalist	
2018	George Saunders	Lincoln in the Bardo	Finalist	
2019	Rebecca Makkai	The Great Believers	Winner	
2019	Tommy Orange	There There	Finalist	
2019	Esi Edugyan	Washington Black	Finalist	
2020	Valeria Luiselli	Lost Children Archive	Winner	
2020	Myla Goldberg	Feast Your Eyes	Finalist	
2020	Ta-Nehisi Coates	The Water Dancer	Finalist	
2021	James McBride	Deacon King Kong	Winner	
2021	Ayad Akhtar	Homeland Elegies	Finalist	
2021	Megha Majumdar	A Burning	Finalist	
2022	Tom Lin	The Thousand Crimes of Ming Tsu	Winner	
2022	Kirstin Valdez Quade	The Five Wounds	Finalist	
2022	Lauren Groff	Matrix	Finalist	
2023	Julie Otsuka	The Swimmers	Winner	
2023	David Santos Donaldson	Greenland	Finalist	
2023	Morgan Talty	Night of the Living Rez	Finalist	
2024	Amanda Peters	The Berry Pickers	Winner	
2024	Christina Wong and Daniel Innes	Denison Avenue	Finalist	
2024	Jesmyn Ward	Let Us Descend	Finalist	
2025	Percival Everett	James	Winner	
2025	Jiaming Tang	Cinema Love	Finalist	
2025	Kaveh Akbar	Martyr!	Finalist	
2026	Megha Majumdar	A Guardian and a Thief	Winner	
2026	Agustina Bazterrica, translated by Sarah Moses	The Unworthy	Finalist	
2026	Han Kang, translated by e. yaewon and Paige Aniyah Morris	We Do Not Part	Finalist	

=== Nonfiction ===
Winners and finalists in nonfiction
Year	Winner	Work	Finalists	Refs.
2012	Robert K. Massie	Catherine the Great: Portrait of a Woman	Winner	
2012	James Gleick	The Information: A History, a Theory, a Flood	Finalist	
2012	Manning Marable	Malcolm X: A Life of Reinvention	Finalist	
2013	Timothy Egan	Short Nights of the Shadow Catcher: The Epic Life and Immortal Photographs of Edward Curtis	Winner	
2013	Jill Lepore	The Mansion of Happiness: A History of Life and Death	Finalist	
2013	David Quammen	Spillover: Animal Infections and the Next Human Pandemic	Finalist	
2014	Doris Kearns Goodwin	The Bully Pulpit: Theodore Roosevelt, William Howard Taft, and the Golden Age of Journalism	Winner	
2014	Nicholas A. Basbanes	On Paper: The Everything of Its Two-Thousand-Year History	Finalist	
2014	Sheri Fink	Five Days at Memorial: Life and Death in a Storm-Ravaged Hospital	Finalist	
2015	Bryan Stevenson	Just Mercy: A Story of Justice and Redemption	Winner	
2015	Elizabeth Kolbert	The Sixth Extinction: An Unnatural History	Finalist	
2015	Lawrence Wright	Thirteen Days in September: Carter, Begin and Sadat at Camp David	Finalist	
2016	Sally Mann	Hold Still: A Memoir with Photographs	Winner	
2016	Helen Macdonald	H is for Hawk	Finalist	
2016	Andrea Wulf	The Invention of Nature: Alexander von Humboldt's New World	Finalist	
2017	Matthew Desmond	Evicted: Poverty and Profit in the American City	Winner	
2017	Patricia Bell-Scott	The Firebrand and the First Lady: Portrait of a Friendship	Finalist	
2017	Patrick Phillips	Blood at the Root: A Racial Cleansing in America	Finalist	
2018	No award given ^{A}			
2018	Daniel Ellsberg	The Doomsday Machine: Confessions of a Nuclear War Planner	Finalist	
2018	David Grann	Killers of the Flower Moon: The Osage Murders and the Birth of the FBI	Finalist	
2019	Kiese Laymon	Heavy: An American Memoir	Winner	
2019	Beth Macy	Dopesick: Dealers, Doctors, and the Drug Company That Addicted America	Finalist	
2019	Francisco Cantú	The Line Becomes a River: Dispatches from the Border	Finalist	
2020	Adam Higginbotham	Midnight in Chernobyl: The Untold Story of the World's Greatest Nuclear Disaster	Winner	
2020	Maria Popova	Figuring	Finalist	
2020	David Treuer	The Heartbeat of Wounded Knee: Native America from 1890 to the Present	Finalist	
2021	Rebecca Giggs	Fathoms: The World in the Whale	Winner	
2021	Claudia Rankine	Just Us: An American Conversation	Finalist	
2021	Natasha Trethewey	Memorial Drive: A Daughter’s Memoir	Finalist	
2022	Hanif Abdurraqib	A Little Devil in America: In Praise of Black Performance	Winner	
2022	Keisha N. Blain; Ibram X. Kendi	Four Hundred Souls: A Community History of African America, 1619–2019	Finalist	
2022	Kristen Radtke	Seek You: A Journey Through American Loneliness	Finalist	
2023	Ed Yong	An Immense World: How Animal Senses Reveal the Hidden Realms Around Us	Winner	
2023	Margo Jefferson	Constructing a Nervous System	Finalist	
2023	Rachel E. Gross	Vagina Obscura: An Anatomical Voyage	Finalist	
2024	Roxanna Asgarian	We Were Once a Family: A Story of Love, Death, and Child Removal in America	Winner	
2024	Jake Bittle	The Great Displacement: Climate Change and the Next American Migration	Finalist	
2024	Darrin Bell	The Talk	Finalist	
2025	Kevin Fedarko	A Walk in the Park: The True Story of a Spectacular Misadventure in the Grand Canyon	Winner	
2025	Adam Higginbotham	Challenger: A True Story of Heroism and Disaster on the Edge of Space	Finalist	
2025	Emily Nussbaum	Cue the Sun! The Invention of Reality TV	Finalist	
2026	Yiyun Li	Things in Nature Merely Grow	Winner	
2026	Mélikah Abdelmoumen, translated by Catherine Khordoc	Baldwin, Styron, and Me	Finalist	
2026	Brian Goldstone	There Is No Place for Us: Working and Homeless in America	Finalist	

== Notes ==
- ^{A} The 2018 Andrew Carnegie Medal for Excellence in Nonfiction was originally awarded to Sherman Alexie for his book, You Don't Have to Say You Love Me: A Memoir, but Alexie declined the award amid sexual harassment allegations. In response, ALA said in a statement that "We acknowledge his decision and will not award the Carnegie nonfiction medal in 2018."
