= Hector =

Trojan hero in Greek mythology

- Crown Prince of Troy
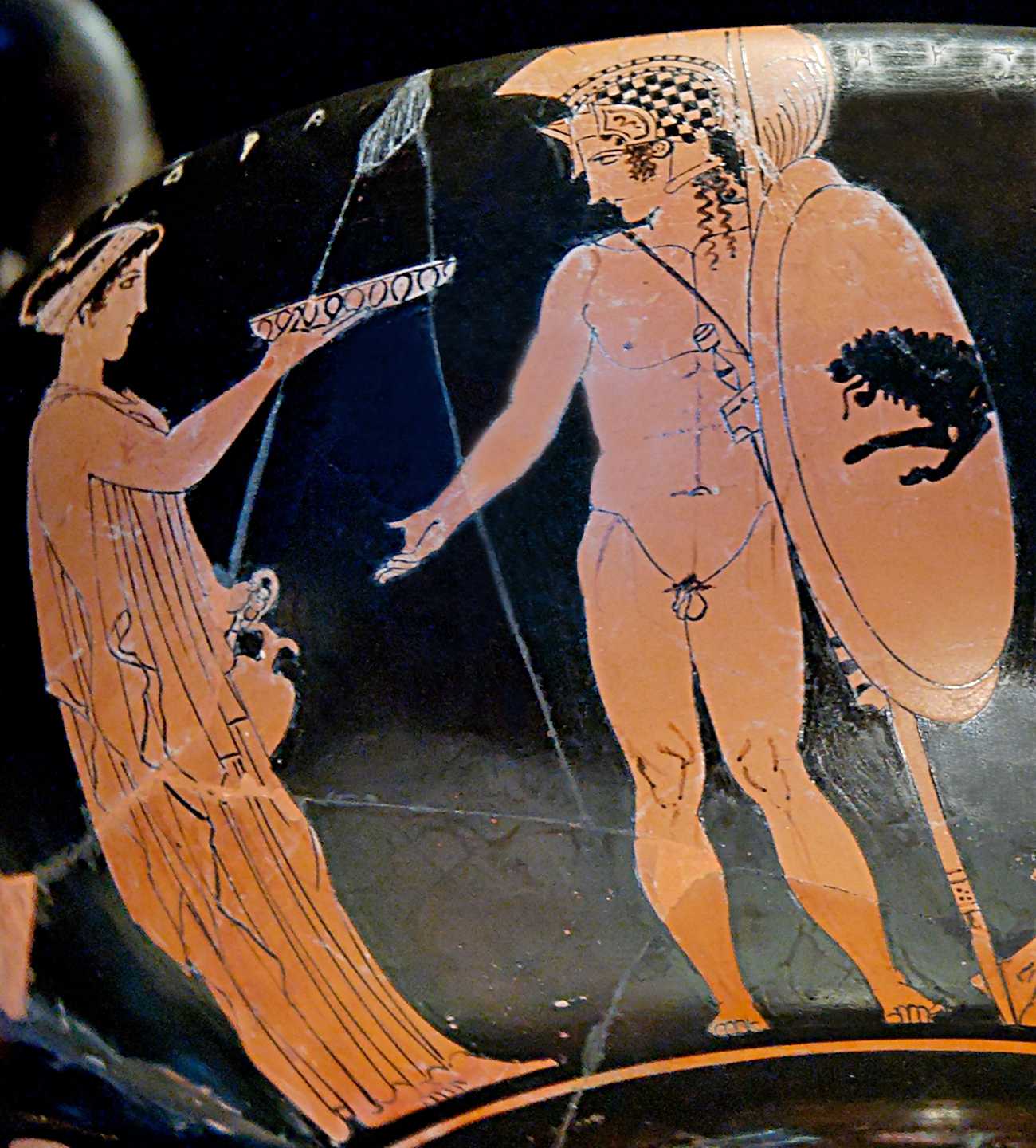
- Fifth century BC depiction of Cassandra offering Hector libations before he goes into battle.
- Abode: Troy

Genealogy
- Born: Troy
- Parents: Priam and Hecuba
- Siblings: Paris, Cassandra, Helenus, Polyxena, Creusa, Troilus, and others
- Spouse: Andromache
- Offspring: Astyanax, Laodamas, Oxynios, Saperneios

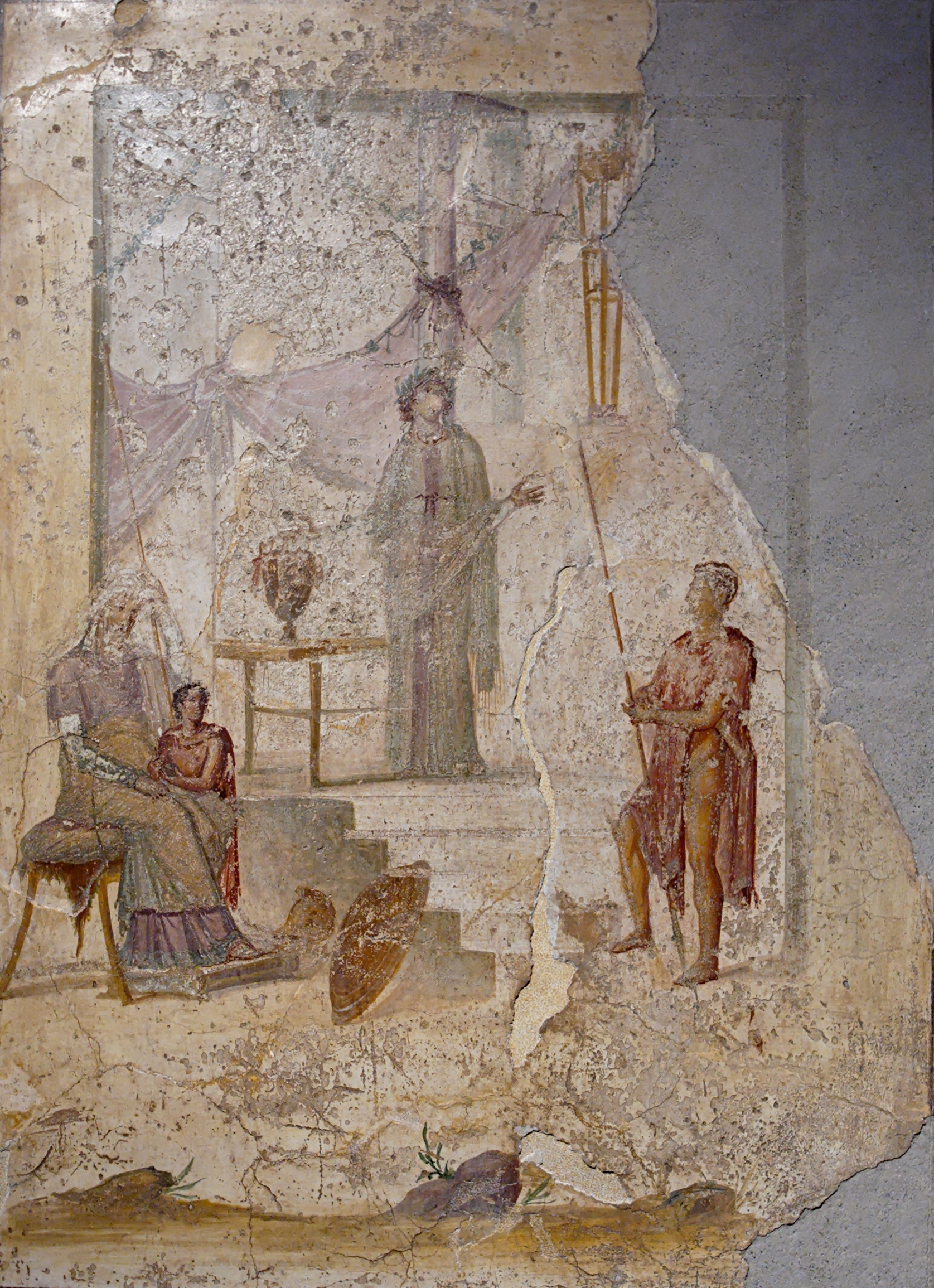
Cassandra (center) drawing lots with her right hand predicts the downfall of Troy in front of Priam (seated, on the left), Paris (holding the apple of discord) and a warrior leaning on a spear, presumably Hector. Fresco in Pompeii, 20-30 AD

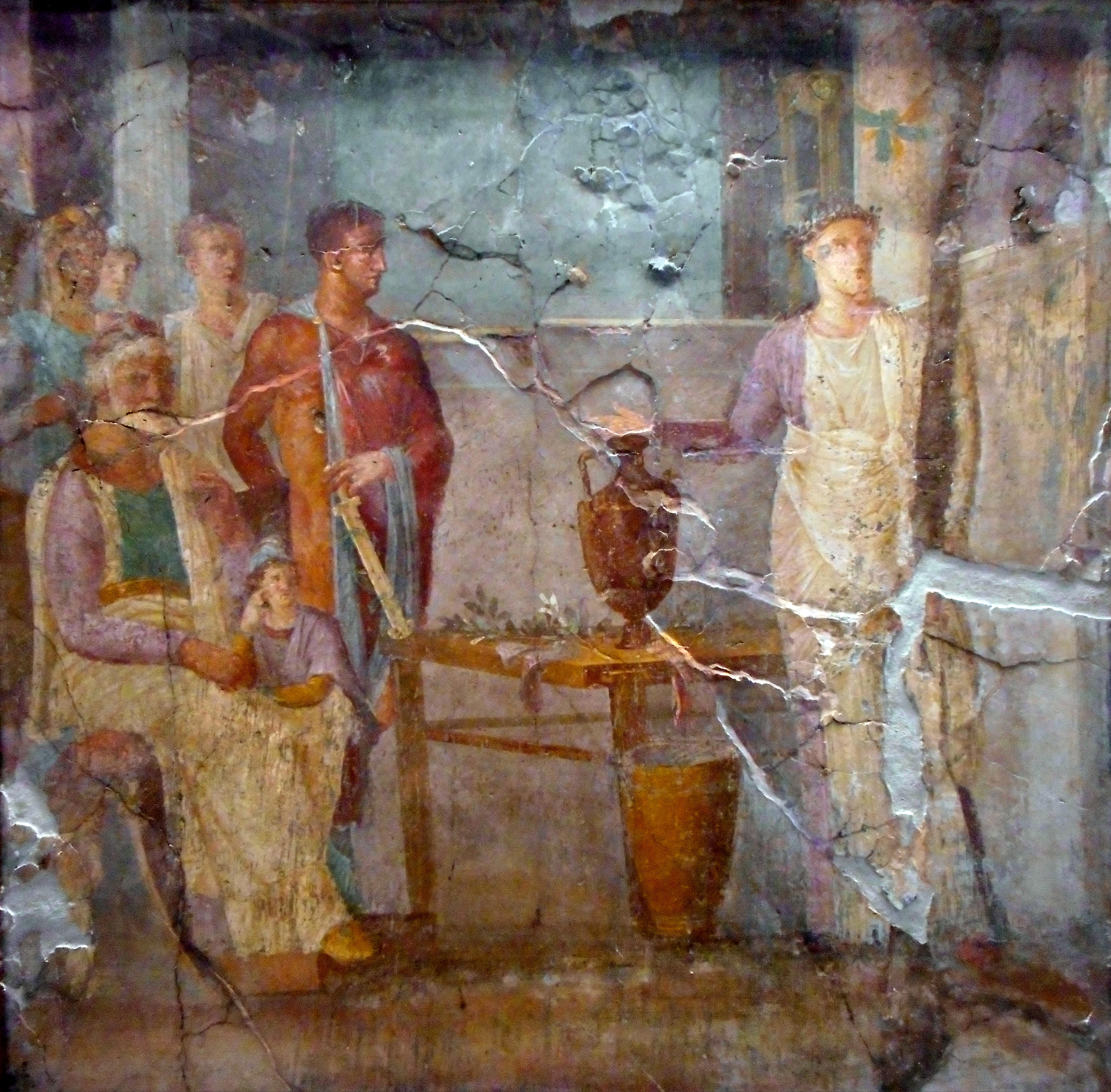
Fresco of Cassandra's prophecy with the presence of presumably Hector, Pompeii

In Greek mythology, Hector (/ˈhɛktər/; Ἕκτωρ, Hektōr, pronounced [héktɔːr]) was a Trojan prince, a hero, and the greatest warrior for Troy during the Trojan War. He is a major character in Homer's Iliad, where he leads the Trojans and their allies in the defense of Troy, killing countless Greek warriors. He is ultimately killed in single combat by the Greek hero Achilles, who proceeds to drag his dead body around Patroclus' funerary bier.

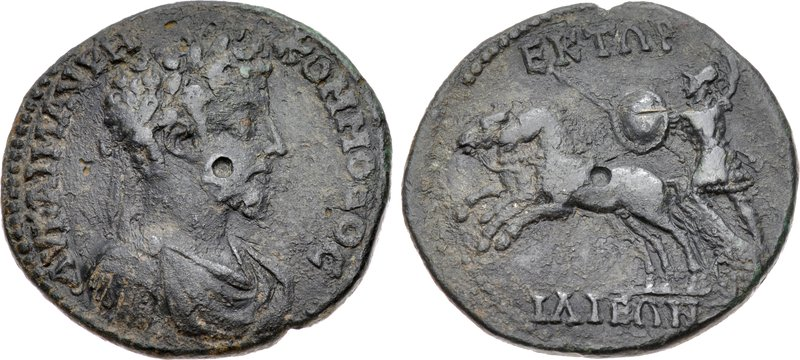
Coin from Troy, 177–192 AD; Obverse: Bust of Commodus; Reverse: Hector, brandishing shield and spear, on a two-horse chariot; ΕΚΤΩΡ (Hektor) inscribed above, ΙΛΙΕΩΝ (Ilion, "Troy") in exergue

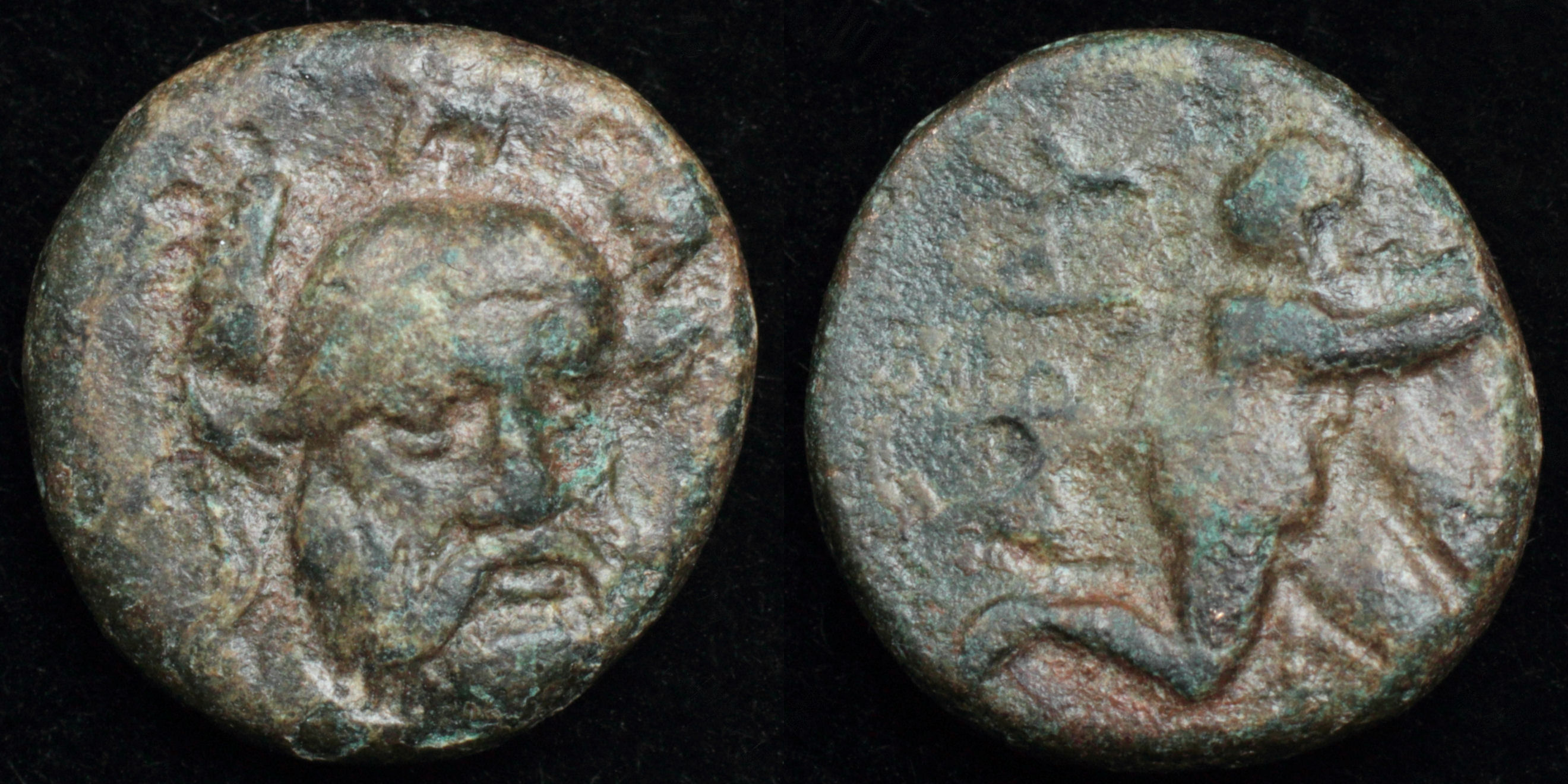
The bronze coin struck in 350–300 BC in Ophryneion, which was considered to be the site of the Tomb of Hector. Obverse depicts bearded Hector wearing triple crested helmet and reverse depicts infant Dionysos.

== Etymology ==
In Greek, Héktōr is a derivative agent noun of the verb ἔχειν ékhein, archaic form *ἕχειν, hékhein ('to have' or 'to hold'), from Proto-Indo-European seɡ́ʰ- ('to hold'); Héktōr, therefore, would seem to mean "holder" or "possessor" (perhaps emphasizing his princely status), or could be taken to mean 'holding fast' (perhaps emphasizing his conduct during the siege of Ilium by the Argives). Héktōr, or Éktōr as found in Aeolic poetry, is also an epithet of Zeus in his capacity as 'he who holds [everything together]'. The name was in use during Mycenaean times, as evidenced by a servant with the name referred to in a Linear B tablet. In the tablet, the name is spelled 𐀁𐀒𐀵, E-ko-to.

Georg Ferdinand Dümmler, followed by Moses I. Finley, proposed that the Homeric hero was partly based on an earlier Theban hero of the same name. Hector had a historic cult in Thebes and the soldiers he kills came from Boeotia, likely meaning that the Troy saga might have originated as a myth of intra-Greek fighting (like in the lost Thebaid) before it along with Hector were transferred to the Anatolian coast and received a new ethnicity.

== Description ==
Hector is described by the sixth-century Christian chronicler John Malalas in his account of the Chronography as "dark-skinned, tall, very stoutly built, strong, good nose, wooly-haired, good beard, squinting, speech defect, noble, fearsome warrior, deep-voiced". Meanwhile, in the account attributed to the legendary Trojan priest and author Dares Phrygius, he is described as "... [speaking] with a slight lisp. His complexion was fair, his hair curly. His eyes would blink attractively. His movements were swift. His face, with its beard, was noble. He was handsome, fierce, and high-spirited, merciful to the citizens, and deserving of love". Greek author and poet Homer portrayed Hector as "peace-loving, thoughtful, as well as bold, a good son, husband and father, and without darker motives." Homer described his hair as "κυάνεος" (kuaneos), which meant blue-black or dark. Philostratus records that Hector kept his hair short because his brother, Paris, wore his long. Tzetzes and Lycophron, however, describe him with hair short at the front and long at the back like a mullet.

== Biography ==
Hector of Troy is a Trojan prince and warrior. He is the first-born son of King Priam and Queen Hecuba, making him a prince of the royal house and heir to his father's throne. In other sources, he is the child of Hecuba and the god Apollo. Hector weds Andromache, who bore him a son, Scamandrius, whom the people of Troy know as Astyanax. According to some accounts, he had other children including Oxynios, Saperneios, and Laodamas.

Hector, throughout the Trojan War, brings glory to the Trojans as their best fighter. He has a reputation for never turning down a fight, is loved by his people and is gracious to all. The Greeks, collectively known as the Achaeans, hate and fear Hector.

When Hector kills Patroclus, Achilles—who had refused to fight because of a slight by Agamemnon—reenters the war to avenge his companion, and the Trojans are beaten back again. Hector's parents plead for him to take shelter within the city walls. Hector refuses, wanting to talk with Achilles, in an attempt to resolve the altercation without bloodshed, though Achilles is not one to be placated after Hector has slain his close companion, Patroclus. Achilles chases Hector around the gates of Troy three times. Apollo gives Hector strength so he can always stay in the lead. But whenever he nears the entrance to the city, Achilles cuts him off. Finally Athena takes the guise of his favorite brother, Deiphobus, telling him that they can face Achilles together. Tricked into thinking he might have a chance at winning, Hector waits for Achilles. He then proposes that whoever wins, be it he or Achilles, will be respectful to the other's body and give it back so there can be a proper burial. Achilles refuses, saying that there is "...no love between us. No truce till the other falls and gluts with blood" (Book 22, 313–314). After a short fight, Achilles stabs Hector in the throat, which results in his fated death. Hector then foretells Achilles' own death, saying that he will be killed by Paris and Apollo.

After slaying him, Achilles strips him of his armor. The other Achaeans then gather to look upon and stab Hector's body. Achilles says a few words in victory and ties Hector's body by the heels to his chariot. He drags the body around the city of Troy, as the Trojans watch from the walls and lament, especially Andromache, Hector's wife. The desecration of Hector's body by Achilles is considered an affront to the gods and ultimately leads to Achilles' downfall.

During and after Patroclus' funeral, Achilles drags Hector's body around his pyre. However, the gods Aphrodite and Apollo protected his body from the dogs, disfigurement, and decomposition. Twelve days elapse before Priam goes to Achilles to ransom his son's body.

== Mythology ==
=== Greatest warrior of Troy ===
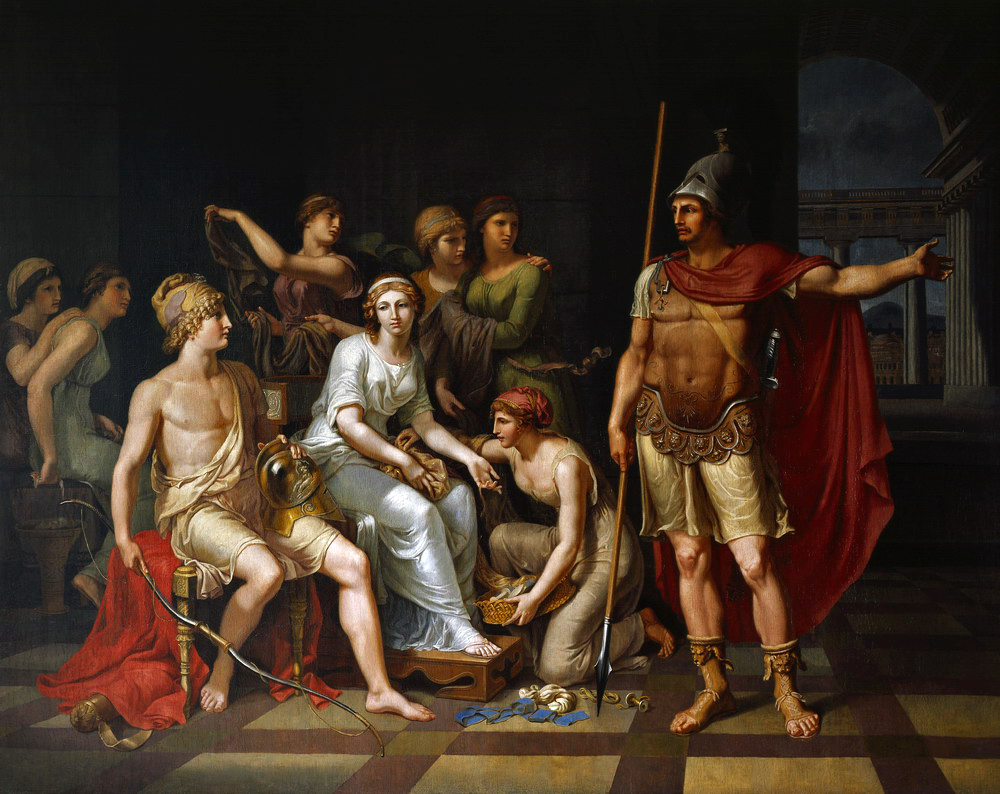
Hector Admonishes Paris for His Softness and Exhorts Him to Go to War by J. H. W. Tischbein (1751–1828)

According to the Iliad, Hector did not approve of war between the Greeks and the Trojans.

For ten years, the Achaeans besieged Troy and their allies in the east. Hector commanded the Trojan army, with a number of subordinates including Polydamas, and his brothers Deiphobus, Helenus and Paris. By all accounts, Hector was the best warrior the Trojans and their allies could field, and his fighting prowess was admired by Greeks and his own people alike.

==== Duel with Protesilaus ====
In the Iliad, Hector's exploits in the war prior to the events of the book are recapitulated. He had fought the Greek champion Protesilaus in single combat at the start of the war and killed him. A prophecy had stated that the first Greek to land on Trojan soil would die. Thus, Protesilaus, Ajax, and Odysseus would not land. Finally, Odysseus threw his shield out and landed on that instead of the ground, Protesilaus jumped next from his own ship onto the ground making him the first to touch the Trojan soil. In the ensuing fight, Hector killed him, fulfilling the prophecy.

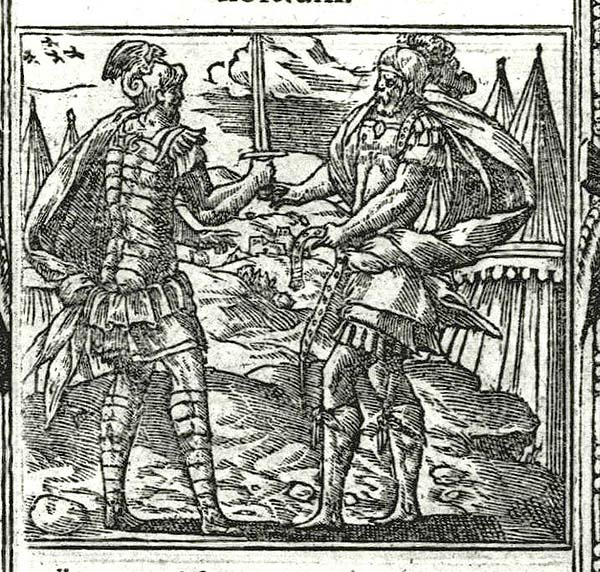
Ajax and Hector exchange gifts (woodcut in Andreas Alciatus, Emblematum libellus, 1591).

==== Duel with Ajax ====
As described by Homer in the Iliad at the advice of Hector's brother Helenus (who also is divinely inspired) and being told by him that he is not destined to die yet, Hector manages to get both armies seated and challenges any one of the Greek warriors to single combat. The Argives are initially reluctant to accept the challenge. However, after Nestor's chiding, nine Greek heroes step up to the challenge and draw by lot to see who is to face Hector. Ajax wins. Hector is unable to pierce Ajax's famous shield, but Ajax crushes Hector's shield with a rock and stabs through his armor with a spear, drawing blood, upon which the god Apollo intervenes, and the duel is ended, as the sun is setting. Hector gives Ajax his sword, which Ajax later uses to kill himself. Ajax gives Hector his girdle that Achilles later attaches to his chariot to drag Hector's corpse around the walls of Troy.

The Greeks and the Trojans make a truce to bury the dead. In the early dawn the next day, the Greeks take advantage of the truce to build a wall and ditch around the ships, while Zeus watches in the distance.

==== Duel with Achilles ====
Another mention of Hector's exploits in the early years of war is given in the Iliad in book IX. During the embassy to Achilles, Odysseus, Phoenix and Ajax all try to persuade Achilles to rejoin the fight. In his response, Achilles points out that while Hector is terrorizing the Greek forces now, and that while he himself had fought in their front lines, Hector had 'no wish' to take his force far beyond the walls and out from the Skaian Gate and nearby oak tree. He then claims, 'There he stood up to me alone one day, and he barely escaped my onslaught.' Another duel takes place, although Hector receives help from Aeneas (his cousin) and Deiphobus, when Hector rushes to try to save his brother Troilus from Achilles. He comes too late; Troilus has already perished. All Hector can do is to take the body, while Achilles escapes after he fights his way through the Trojan reinforcements.

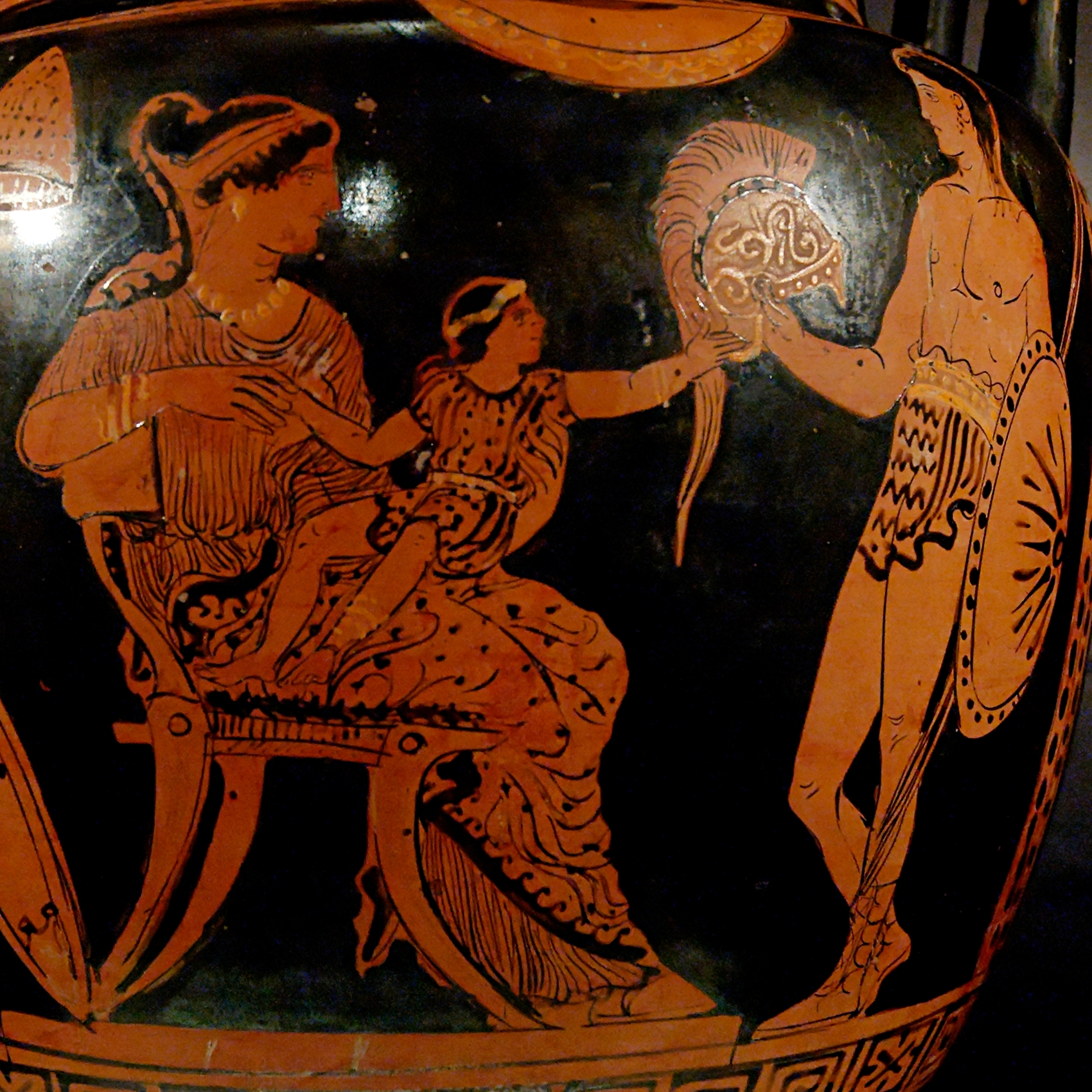
Hector's last visit with his wife, Andromache, and infant son Astyanax, startled by his father's helmet (Apulian red-figure vase, 370–360 BC)

In the tenth year of the war, observing Paris avoiding combat with Menelaus, Hector scolds him with having brought trouble on his whole country and now refusing to fight. Paris therefore proposes single combat between himself and Menelaus, with Helen to go to the victor, ending the war. The duel, however, leads to inconclusive results due to intervention by Aphrodite, who leads Paris off the field. After Pandarus wounds Menelaus with an arrow, the fight begins again.

The Greeks attack and drive the Trojans back. Hector must now go out to lead a counter-attack. According to Homer, his wife Andromache, carrying in her arms her son Astyanax, intercepts Hector at the gate, pleading with him not to go out for her sake as well as his son's. Hector knows that Troy and the house of Priam are doomed to fall and that the gloomy fate of his wife and infant son will be to die or go into slavery in a foreign land. With understanding, compassion, and tenderness, he explains that he cannot personally refuse to fight, and comforts her with the idea that no one can take him until it is his time to go. The gleaming bronze helmet frightens Astyanax and makes him cry. Hector takes it off, embraces his wife and son, and for his sake prays aloud to Zeus that his son might be chief after him, become more glorious in battle than he, to bring home the blood of his enemies, and make his mother proud. Once he leaves for battle, those in the house begin to mourn, as they know he would not return. Hector and Paris pass through the gate and rally the Trojans, raising havoc among the Greeks.

=== Trojan counter-attack ===
Zeus weighs the fates of the two armies in the balance, and that of the Greeks sinks. The Trojans press the Greeks into their camp over the ditch and wall and would have laid hands on the ships, but Agamemnon personally rallies the Greeks. The Trojans are driven off, night falls, and Hector resolves to take the camp and burn the ships the next day. The Trojans bivouac in the field.

A thousand camp-fires gleamed upon the plain ....

The next day Agamemnon rallies the Greeks and drives the Trojans

like a herd of cows maddened with fright when a lion has attacked them ...

Hector refrains from battle until Agamemnon leaves the field, wounded in the arm by a spear. Then Hector rallies the Trojans:

... like some fierce tempest that swoops down upon the sea ...

Diomedes and Odysseus hinder Hector and win the Greeks some time to retreat, but the Trojans sweep down upon the wall and rain blows upon it. The Greeks in the camp contest the gates to secure entrance for their fleeing warriors. The Trojans try to pull down the ramparts while the Greeks rain arrows upon them. Hector smashes open a gate with a large stone, clears the gate, and calls on the Trojans to scale the wall, which they do, and

... all was uproar and confusion.

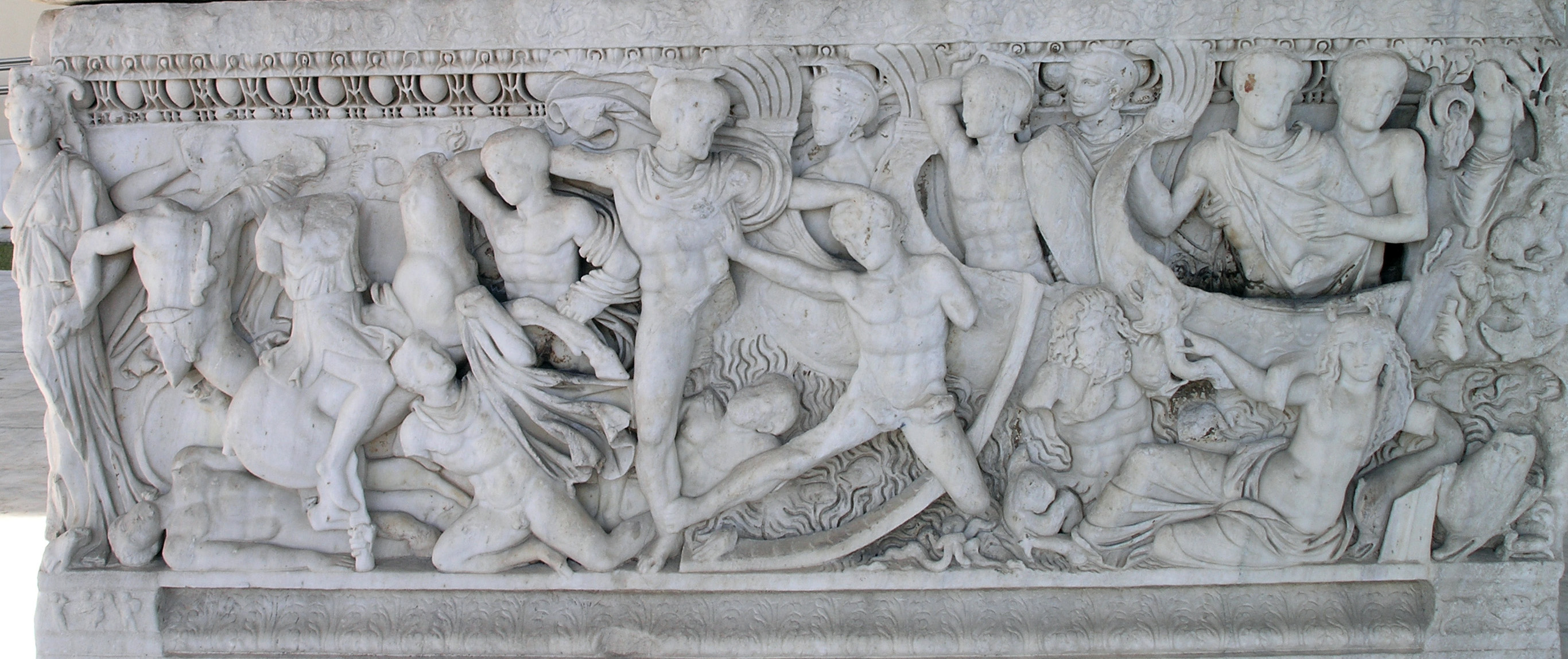
Battle at the ships, on a Roman-era sarcophagus, 225–250 AD

The battle rages inside the camp. Hector goes down, hit by a stone thrown by Ajax, but Apollo arrives from Olympus and infuses strength into "the shepherd of the people", who orders a chariot attack, with Apollo clearing the way. After much war across several books of the Iliad, Hector lays hold of Protesilaus' ship and calls for fire. The Trojans cannot bring it to him, as Ajax kills everyone who tries. Eventually, Hector breaks Ajax's spear with his sword, forcing him to give ground, and he sets the ship ablaze.

These events are all according to the will of the gods, who have decreed the fall of Troy, and therefore intend to tempt Achilles back into the war. Patroclus, Achilles' closest companion, disguised in Achilles' armor, enters the combat leading the Myrmidons and the rest of the Achaeans to force a Trojan withdrawal. After Patroclus has routed the Trojan army, Hector, with the aid of Apollo and Euphorbus, kills Patroclus, vaunting over him:

"Wretch! Achilleus, great as he was, could do nothing to help you."

The dying Patroclus foretells Hector's death:

"You yourself are not one who shall live long, but now already death and powerful destiny are standing beside you, to go down under the hands of Aiakos' great son, Achilleus"

=== Hector's last fight ===
Alas! the gods have lured me on to my destruction. ... death is now indeed exceedingly near at hand and there is no way out of it – for so Zeus and his son Apollo the far-darter have willed it, though heretofore they have been ever ready to protect me. My doom has come upon me; let me not then die ingloriously and without a struggle, but let me first do some great thing that shall be told among men hereafter.

— Spoken by Hector facing Achilles, after a missed spear-throw; Iliad, Book XXII, lines 299–305

Hector strips the armor of Achilles off the fallen Patroclus and gives it to his men to take back to the city. Glaucus accuses Hector of cowardice for not challenging Ajax. Stung, Hector calls for the armor, puts it on, and uses it to rally the Trojans. Zeus regards the donning of a hero's armor as an act of insolence by a fool about to die, but it makes Hector strong for now.

The next day, the enraged Achilles renounces the wrath that kept him out of action and routs the Trojans, forcing them back to the city. Hector chooses to remain outside the gates of Troy to face Achilles – motivated in part due to having ignored Polydamas's counsel to retreat the night before, a decision which led to the deaths of many Trojans. Achilles chases him around the city three times before Hector masters his fear and turns to face Achilles. But Athena, in the disguise of Hector's brother Deiphobus, has deluded Hector. He requests from Achilles that the victor should return the other's body after the duel (though Hector himself made it clear he planned to throw the body of Patroclus to the dogs), but Achilles refuses. Achilles hurls his spear at Hector, who dodges it, but Athena brings it back to Achilles' hands without Hector noticing. Hector then throws his own spear at Achilles; it hits his shield and does no injury. When Hector turns to face his supposed brother to retrieve another spear, he sees no one there. At that moment he realizes that he is doomed. Hector decides that he will go down fighting and that men will talk about his bravery in years to come.

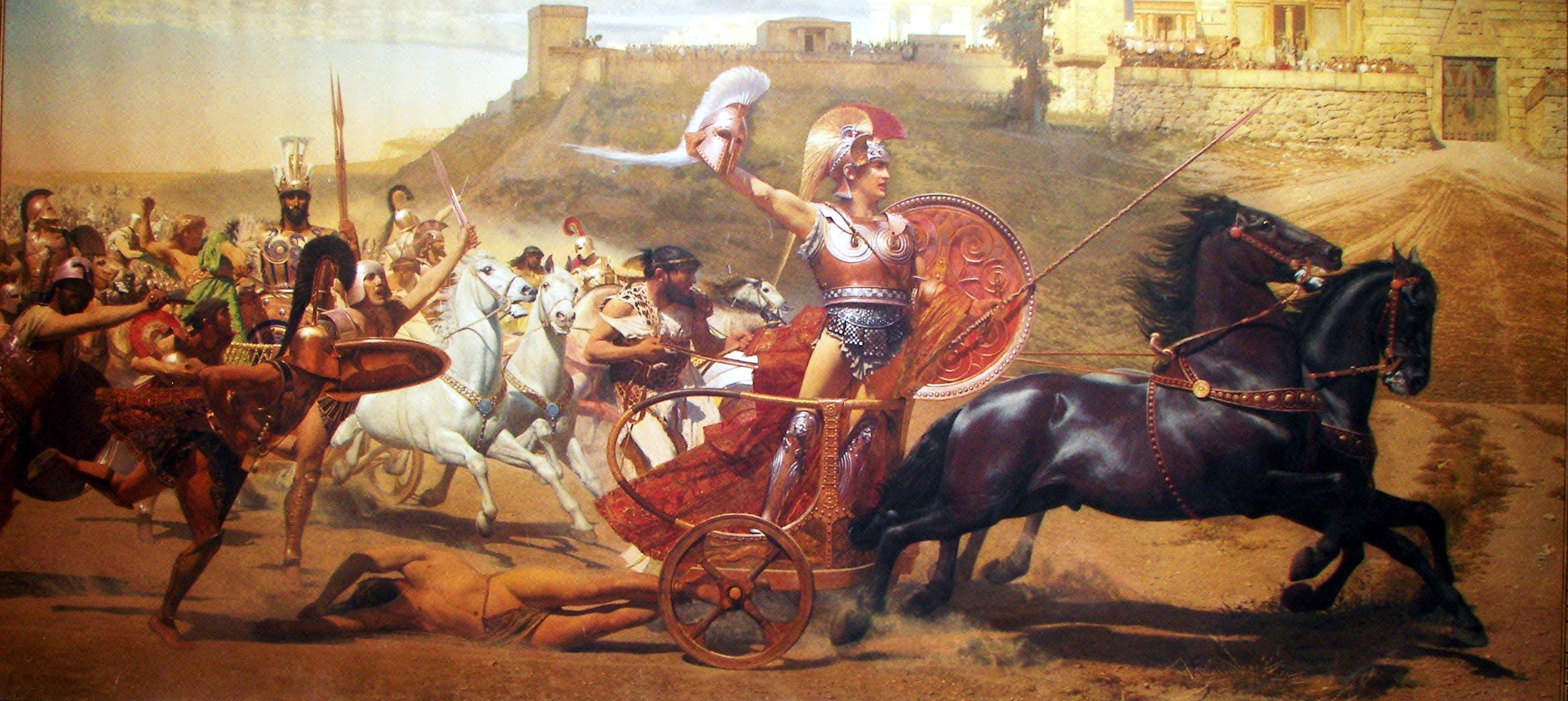
Triumphant Achilles dragging Hector's lifeless body in Troy. (A fresco in the Achilleion, Corfu)

Hector pulls out his sword, now his only weapon, and charges. But Achilles grabs his thrown spears that were delivered to him by the unseen Athena. Achilles then aims his spear and strikes Hector around the collar bone, the only part of the stolen armor of Achilles that did not protect Hector. The wound is fatal yet allowed Hector to speak to Achilles. In his final moments, Hector begs Achilles for an honorable funeral, but Achilles replies that he will let the dogs and vultures devour Hector's flesh. Hector dies, prophesying that Achilles' death will follow soon:

Be careful now; for I might be made into the gods' curse upon you, on that day when Paris and Phoibos Apollo destroy you in the Skaian gates, for all your valor.

After his death, Achilles slits Hector's heels and passes the girdle that Ajax had given Hector through the slits. He then fastens the girdle to his chariot and drives his fallen enemy through the dust to the Danaan camp. For the next twelve days, Achilles mistreats the body, but it remains preserved from all injury by Apollo and Aphrodite. After these twelve days, the gods can no longer stand watching it and send down two messengers: Iris, another messenger god, and Thetis, the mother of Achilles. Thetis has told Achilles to allow King Priam to come and take the body for ransom. Once King Priam has been notified that Achilles will allow him to claim the body, he goes to his strongroom to withdraw the ransom. The ransom King Priam offers includes twelve fine robes, twelve white mantles, several richly embroidered tunics, ten bars of yellow gold, a very beautiful cup, and several cauldrons. Priam himself goes to claim his son's body, and Hermes grants him safe passage by casting a charm that will make anyone who looks at him fall asleep.

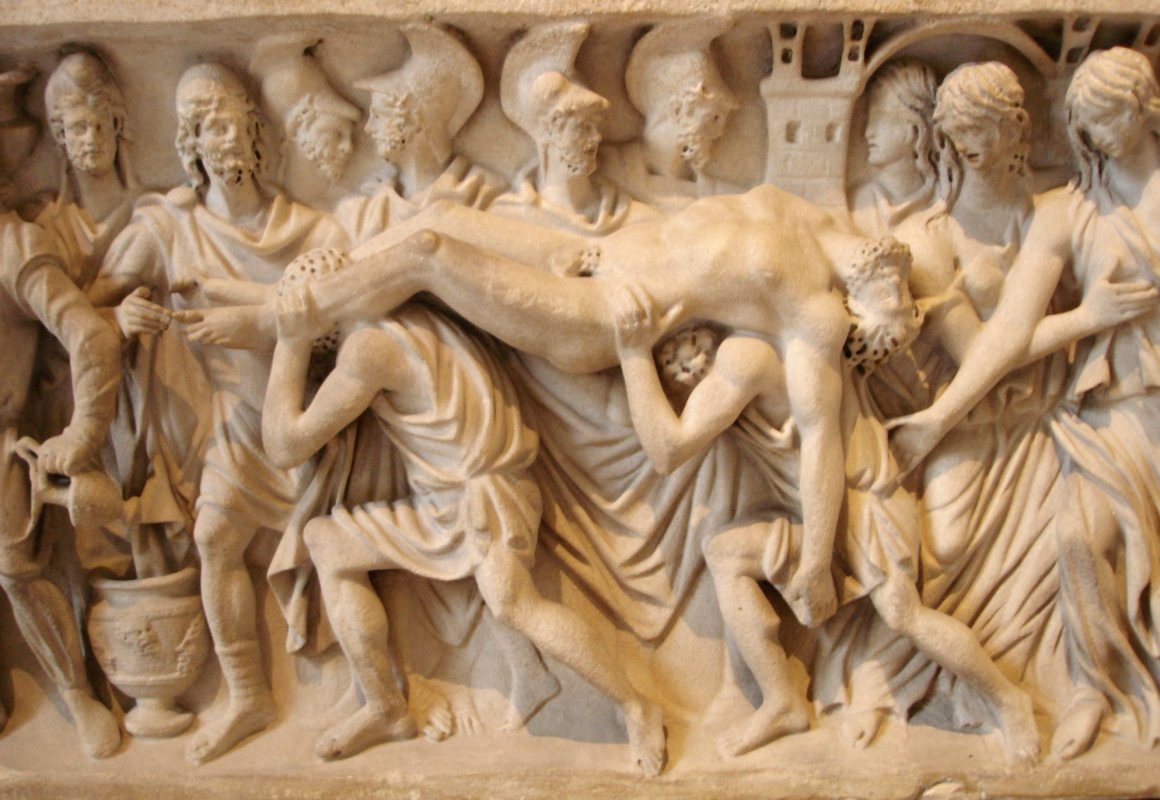
Hector's body is brought back to Troy, from a Roman sarcophagus ca. 180–200 AD.

Think of thy father, and this helpless face behold
See him in me, as helpless and as old!
Though not so wretched: there he yields to me,
The first of men in sovereign misery!
Thus forced to kneel, thus groveling to embrace
The scourge and ruin of my realm and race;
Suppliant my children’s murderer to implore,
And kiss those hands yet reeking with their gore!

— Spoken by Priam to Achilles; (Iliad, Book XXIV), Pope's translation

Achilles is moved by Priam's actions and, following his mother's orders sent by Zeus, returns Hector's body to Priam and promises him a truce of twelve days to allow the Trojans to perform funeral rites for Hector. Priam returns to Troy with the body of his son, and it is given full funeral honors. Even Helen mourns Hector, for he had always been kind to her and protected her from spite. The last lines of the Iliad are dedicated to Hector's funeral. Homer concludes by referring to the Trojan prince as the "Breaker of Horses."

In Virgil's Aeneid, the dead Hector appears to Aeneas during the fall of Troy in a dream, urging him to flee Troy.

=== Hector's tomb at Thebes ===
The Thebans had a tomb dedicated to Hector near the Fountain of Oedipus. According to Theban tradition, Hector's bones had been brought from Troy to Thebes in response to an oracle of Zeus, which instructed the inhabitants to bring his remains to their city and honour him as a hero. The oracle promised that doing so would bring prosperity to their land.

== Reception and analysis ==
Many scholars consider Hector to be the most sympathetic character in the Iliad, more than the main hero of the story, Achilles. For example, Richmond Lattimore writes that Hector "is still the hero who forever captures the affection of the modern reader, far more strongly than his conqueror [Achilles] has ever done". Hector's strong emotional relationship with his family has been cited as a feature which makes his character particularly sympathetic and tragic. Lattimore and Steven Farron interpret Hector as a naturally unwarlike person driven to fight by the circumstances. Lattimore writes that Hector does not believe in Paris' cause but fights anyway out of a sense of duty and concern about the opinions of others:

Some hidden weakness, not cowardice but perhaps the fear of being called a coward, prevents him from liquidating a war which he knows perfectly well is unjust. This weakness, which is not remote from his boasting, nor from his valour [...], is what kills him.

Emily Wilson describes Hector as bringing on his own death through his pursuit of martial glory, itself a result of his "dread of shame" and the demands of his social role as a warrior. Instead of following his wife's practical advice to defend Troy from the city wall, Hector insists on fighting on the frontlines for the sake of glory. Thus, Wilson writes, Hector isolates himself from his society and its immediate needs through his efforts to uphold the warrior's code. James M. Redfield sees Hector's fate in the Iliad as "in some general sense fated and necessary" but "also, when and as it occurs, the consequence of his own errors and chosen by himself". Ultimately, writes Redfield, it is not any flaw in Hector's character which leads to his doom but his aidos ('shame' or 'fear of disgrace'). From the perspective of Homeric culture, where morality and conformity to social norms are not distinguished, aidos is the "emotional foundation of virtue". Hector falls victim to his fear of disgrace before his community and is "defeated by his own characteristic goodness".

Many, but not all, scholars of the Iliad see an incongruence between Hector's in-story reputation and his actual achievements. He is described by different characters as the most fearsome warrior among the Trojans but falls short of these expectations on many occasions. Examples of this include his poor performance in duels with Ajax and Diomedes; his avoidance of Agamemnon; his victory over Patroclus only with the help of Apollo and another Trojan; and his flight in fear from Achilles before finally facing him. Different explanations have been proposed for this inconsistency. According to John Scott, who theorized that Hector was invented by Homer and not present in the pre-Homeric tradition of the Trojan War, Homer could not change the circumstances of the deaths of the major Greek heroes by having them be slain by Hector. Therefore, he gave Hector "human and moral excellences" to make up for his lack of martial achievements. According to another view, in the original tradition, Hector was in fact a great warrior, but his achievements were deliberately diminished by later bards (per the Analyst view of the Homeric epics' composition) because of their pro-Greek bias. Lattimore writes that Homer's consistent efforts to reduce Hector's achievements result in one of the poet's "accidental triumphs", since they actually make the reader "sense deception, and feel that Hektor 'really was' greater than Patroklos or any other Achaian except Achilleus". Steven Farron agrees that the incongruence between Hector's achievements and reputation is a deliberate choice by the author but rejects the idea that it reflects a pro-Greek bias. Farron states:

The contradictions between Hector's domestic strengths and military weaknesses and between his reputation and achievements form a coherent, tragic character. His tragedy is that he is a peaceful, home-loving man who is forced by circumstances into the role of the great hero and defender of Troy. But despite his desperate efforts, he is unable to fulfil that role and live up to the expectations that everyone, including himself, has for him.

== In literature ==
- Hector was the subject of a lost play by the 4th-century tragedian Astydamas, which the historian Plutarch described as a masterpiece on par with those of Aeschylus and Sophocles
- Hector is mentioned in several poems in the Greek Anthology, a large collection of short poems, primarily epigrams, written in Greek.
- In Dante Alighieri's Inferno (part of the Divine Comedy), Hector and his family are placed in Limbo, the outer circle wherein the virtuous non-Christians dwell.
- In Chang-rae Lee's The Surrendered, Hector is the name of one of the major characters and is originally from Ilion, New York.
- Roland's sword in the early 12th-century French poem Song of Roland was named Durendal. According to Ludovico Ariosto's Orlando Furioso and Matteo Maria Boiardo's Orlando Innamorato, it once belonged to Hector of Troy, and was given to Roland by Malagigi (Maugris). In both works, Hector’s armor is worn by Mandricardo.
- In William Shakespeare's Troilus and Cressida, Hector's death is used to mark the conclusion of the play. His nobility is shown in stark contrast to the deceit and pridefulness of the Greeks, especially Achilles.
- Influencing Shakespeare's work, Geoffrey Chaucer's Troilus and Criseyde and Giovanni Boccaccio's Il Filostrato both depict Hector as a dutiful and chivalrous foil to Trolio, who is impulsively swayed by emotion.

== See also ==
- List of children of Priam
- Nine Worthies
