= Joseph Mungo Reed =

- Born: London, England
- Education: University of Edinburgh; Syracuse University (MFA); University of Manchester (PhD)
- Occupations: Novelist, educator
- Writing career
- Genres: Literary fiction, psychological fiction
- Notable works: We Begin Our Ascent (2018); Hammer (2022); Terrestrial History (2025)
- Website: www.joemungoreed.com

Joseph Mungo Reed (or Joe Mungo Reed) is a British novelist and academic who is known for his novels We Begin Our Ascent, Hammer, and Terrestrial History, for which he was long-listed for the Andrew Carnegie Medal for Excellence in Fiction. Reed has also contributed stories and essays to publications including Esquire, Virginia Quarterly Review, the Evening Standard, Corriere della Sera, and Literary Hub. Currently, he serves as the Co-Director of the MSt in Creative Writing at the University of Cambridge.

== Early life and education ==
Born in London and raised in Gloucestershire, Reed attended the University of Edinburgh, where he earned a degree in philosophy and politics. Later, he pursued an MFA in creative writing under George Saunders at Syracuse University, where he was awarded the Joyce Carol Oates Award in Fiction. Following this, he earned a PhD in creative writing at the University of Manchester.

== Bibliography ==
=== Novels ===
- We Begin Our Ascent (2018) ISBN 978-1501169205
- Hammer (2022) ISBN 978-1982122799
- Terrestrial History (2025) ISBN 978-1324079378

=== Collections and anthologies ===
- Underground Tales For London (2018)
- Best of Gigantic (Contributor)
