= A Gesture Life =

1999 novel written by Chang-Rae Lee

- Hardback cover
- Author: Chang-Rae Lee
- Language: English
- Genre: Novel
- Publisher: Riverhead Books
- Publication date: September 6, 1999
- Publication place: United States
- Media type: Print (hardcover)
- Pages: 356
- ISBN: 978-1-57322-146-7
- OCLC: 41488613
- LC Class: PS3562.E3347 G4 1999
- Preceded by: Native Speaker

A Gesture Life is a 1999 novel written by Korean-American author Chang-Rae Lee which takes the form of a narrative of an elderly medical-supply salesman named Doc Hata, who deals with everyday life in a small town in the United States called Bedley Run, and who remembers treating Korean comfort women for the Japanese Imperial Army during World War II. He once owned a medical and surgical supply store and he has an adopted daughter named Sunny. All the problems which Doc Hata has to deal with stem from his experiences serving the Japanese Imperial Army in the World War II.

Chang-Rae Lee won the Asian American Literary Award and Anisfield-Wolf Book Award in Fiction for the novel.

== Plot summary ==
The whole story, told by the first person narrator Doc Hata, consists of flashbacks. The main story line begins from the time he gives up his store in Bedley Run until he meets his adopted daughter again. The sub story lines show the reader about his time during the war, and about his difficulties raising his teenage daughter.

At the beginning of the story, Doc Hata describes his current situation and place of living. He lives in a small but affluent town called Bedley Run, where he is from the first accepted by the other inhabitants as a decent shopkeeper and later revered as the ideal citizen. His previous occupation is revealed to be that of a shop owner, as he formerly owned the pharmacy named Sunny Medical Supply, which he has sold to a young couple from New York. He has difficulty leaving his old life behind him and visits his old store nearly every day.

Liv Crawford, a real estate agent, wants Doc Hata to move and sell his house. Doc Hata thinks a lot about his past in Bedley Run but also about his past experiences in Japan. He gives many insights into his daily routines, such as walking by his old store and going to swim every day in his pool. He thinks a lot about his daughter Sunny and how she arrived when she was a little girl. Later on, it becomes clear that Sunny was adopted and that Doc Hata specifically wanted a girl, and even bribed the relevant person to get what he wanted. He remembers Sunny playing the piano and the initial problems he had with her.

In the first flashback he remembers his time with Mary Burns, one of his neighbors. He remembers meeting her the first time during his gardening. She quickly becomes a kind of girlfriend for him and spends a lot of time with Sunny, who does not accept her at all. In her first conversation with Doc Hata it becomes clear that he is not a real doctor, but that everybody calls him 'doc' because of his store. Mary Burns is very impressed by him because he lives in a house that would fit a real doctor and his salary. At the beginning, the relationship between Doc Hata and Mary Burns is very close but they soon start to argue about Sunny and how Doc Hata treats her.

Doc Hata gives one piece of information about his daughter after the other, never giving all the information. While the story is going on it becomes clear that a big fight between Doc Hata and Sunny took place a while ago and separated them. During a stay in the hospital, where he has to stay for almost burning his own house, Doc Hata remembers what this fight was about. In the hospital Officer Como's daughter visits Doc Hata and he begins to remember which problems Sunny had with Officer Como. Sunny was in trouble and she did not accept the authority of the police officer. It becomes clear via flashbacks that Sunny runs away from home and meets with dubious persons.

Hata is determined to find Sunny again from the information given to him by a police officer. He also gives more background information on his conflict with Sunny. He encounters her in a mall, where failure of business is imminent in all the stores except for the one Sunny manages. She now has a son, named Thomas. Doc Hata tries to reconcile with Sunny by offering to help her take care of her son, whom Sunny is too busy to pay attention to. Sunny also expresses her need to find new ways of employment, as her store will be closing soon.

In a flashback, Hata focuses on his relationship with K, a sex slave (comfort woman) from Korea. Originally, Captain Ono expresses a peculiar interest in her, and Hata as well; Ono tells Hata that she is to be kept away from the comfort house, where the other comfort women are staying, and also tells him to inform everyone that she is sick, signified by a kurohata (black flag), to make sure that only he had access to her. K grows close to Lieutenant Kurohata, because they are able to talk to each other in her native tongue. The two speak frequently of their backgrounds, and it is revealed that K is from a higher-class family that did not value their daughters, resulting in her "volunteering" to become a comfort woman. Kurohata finds himself thinking about her frequently, growing more anxious to see her in the evenings every day. He falls in love with her intelligent demeanor and ethereal beauty. He is overcome with desire and rapes her. Later, Captain Ono tells Lieutenant Kurohata that he is going to have sex with K, and when he reports this to K, she begs him to kill her, saying that if he truly did love her, he wouldn't naively think that they could live together after the war. Kurohata refuses. When Ono arrives and tries to have sex with her, she stabs him in the throat, killing him. She asks Hata to kill her too with Ono's pistol, but instead, he fires his gun at Ono's corpse and tells the others that Ono was showing off his gun and accidentally killed himself. In the end, Doc Hata does not say explicitly that K died after she is raped by 30 or more soldiers, but it is clear that she dies. He admits that he has frequent hallucinations of her in his house in Bedley Run, draped with a black flag.

Doc Hata eventually changes for the better and appears to move on from his traumatic experiences in the war. He and Sunny appear to grow closer again, and he is shown selling his house.

== Characters ==
=== Doc (Franklin) Hata ===
The figure of Doc Hata functions as the narrator and tells every part of the story through his eyes. He tells us not only about his time in Bedley Run, but also very briefly about his childhood, then about his time in World War II, and also about his time with his daughter Sunny. He does not tell all these events in chronological order but instead in sporadic episodes. The novel consists of several flashbacks which tell us more about Hata's life and his rituals.

Hata lives in a grand house located in Bedley Run, owned a medical store, and was a medic in World War II. His name is Japanese, but he is an ethnic Korean and was adopted by a childless Japanese couple. He lived his youth on the south-western coast of Japan. He tells us that he was not a nice child, but a difficult one, who was not generous to his foster parents who treated him as considerately as a real son.

He is stationed in Burma in 1944 during the war. He is there as a paramedical officer, field-trained but not formally educated. He is referred to as Lieutenant Jiro Kurohata. In Burma, he is responsible for taking care of the comfort women, who are responsible for maintaining morale and "health". Not only is he responsible for their upkeep, but he also falls in love with one of the girls, Kkutaeh. At this time he thinks that Kkutaeh, referred to by Hata as K, is in love with him, too, but later it becomes clear that this love was unilateral.

In Hata's first years in Bedley Run, he owns a store called Sunny Medical Supply, named after his daughter. He adopts Sunny when she is a young girl. Although he tells everybody that he is a happy father, in reality, he has a lot of problems with her, as he is too generous and too frequently expresses his concerns with her future. He attempts to create a happy family when he meets Mary Burns, but Sunny disapproves. All these things induce Sunny to leave her father.

Doc Hata is a man who lives his life through rituals. He is not fond of the "retirement lifestyle", so he continues his routine day after day. His life motto is "Routine triumphs over everything". Eventually, he breaks his comfortable repetition.

=== Sunny ===
Sunny is the reserved and rebellious daughter of Doc Hata.

As a young girl, she is sent by a Christian Adoption Agency to Hata in the United States. She is immediately uncomfortable. She does not like Hata's house, and later, dislikes her adopted father's behavior. As a teenager, she becomes very difficult and is rarely home. She does not respect anyone, opposing Hata and Mary Burns and even the police. She spends her nights in a disreputable part of town with hoodlums. When Doc Hata becomes aware of her behavior, the two of them fight, and this causes Sunny to permanently leave the house. Sunny is sexually assaulted by one of the men she is living with, and her assailant is stabbed by another housemate in Sunny's defense. She revisits her home with Hata. It soon becomes clear that she and Doc Hata cannot repair their relationship as father and daughter. One event which makes their relationship more strained is when Hata forces Sunny to have an abortion. After this occurs, it is implied that Sunny leaves for good, never to see her father again.

As an adult, Sunny works at the Ebbington Mall as a shop manager. She is 32 when she and Hata meet again. Sunny also has a son, named Thomas, who is almost six years old. Hata tries to do everything to help Sunny, including taking care of Thomas. She accepts that Hata and Thomas spend a lot of time together, but she does not want Thomas to know that Hata is his grandfather. The situation between Hata and Sunny improves towards the end.

=== Mary Burns ===
Mary Burns was Hata's neighbor and girlfriend during his middle age. (She dies before the events of the book begin, but much of the past is told in present tense.) She spends a lot of time in the country club of Bedley Run, where she is very socially active. She has two adult daughters who do not live at home and who rarely visit their mother. Her late husband, a doctor, is deceased as well.

She first meets Doc Hata while he was working in his garden. She mistakes Hata for a doctor, like her husband was. After their first meeting, Hata and Mary Burns develop an intimate relationship, as they provide each other company and go out frequently together. Mary Burns spends a lot of time with Sunny, but she fails in coming any closer to her. This and the fact that she is not happy about how Hata treats his daughter ends their relationship. She dies before the events of the book begin.

=== K ===
K, whose real name is Kkutaeh, is an intellectual Korean girl who is brought with her sister as a sex slave (comfort woman) to the camp in which Hata works as medical officer. At home she has two more sisters and one brother.

She is, like all the other girls, placed under Hata's care. Her sister is mercy-killed by a soldier that takes pity on her, who is later executed. A senior officer and head doctor, Captain Ono, takes special interest in K. Captain Ono isolates her from the rest of the camp, locking her in a small storage closet at night. When K is not with Captain Ono, presumably servicing him, she is with Hata in the infirmary. Both men pretend that she is sick during this time so that she can avoid servicing the rest of the camp. Hata falls in love with her after spending a lot of time with her; when Hata tells her this, she accuses him of lying, saying he only wants her for sex. However, she sees Hata's "love" for her as an opportunity, and she asks him to kill her. He refuses to do so, naively believing that she will be able to survive all of this. He is also unable to kill Captain Ono whose attentions and intentions toward K are base in nature.

The love Hata has toward K is one-sided at best. He consummates his love for her while she is sleeping, which he clearly does not view as rape. However, he does hear her cry after he leaves her.

== Awards ==
Year	Award	Category	Result	Ref.
2000	Anisfield-Wolf Book Award	Fiction	Won	
2000	Asian American Literary Award	Fiction	Won	
2000	NAIBA Book of the Year Award	—	Won	

== Citing ==
- Lee, Chang-Rae (1999). A Gesture Life (hardcover 1st ed.). London: Granta Books. ISBN 9781573221467.
