= The Surrendered =

2010 novel by Chang-Rae Lee

- Hardback cover
- Author: Chang-Rae Lee
- Language: English
- Genre: Novel
- Publisher: Riverhead Books
- Publication date: March 2010
- Publication place: United States
- Media type: Print (hardcover)
- Pages: 469

The Surrendered is a 2010 novel by Korean-American author Chang-Rae Lee about the lives of three characters during the Korean War. The novel also flashes back to the Japanese invasion of Manchuria and flashes forward to the 1980s in New York City and Italy. The book makes references to the Gallic Wars, Hector, and A Memory of Solferino, among other works. It was nominated as a finalist for the 2011 Pulitzer Prize for Fiction and won the Dayton Literary Peace Prize in 2011.

== Characters ==
- June Han – A Korean girl who became an orphan after the death of her family
- Hector Brennan – American janitor and former soldier of Korean War
- Sylvie Tanner – wife of a missionary who had a troubled past and becomes involved in an affair with Hector
- Benjamin Li – Sylvie's mentor
- Ames Tanner – Sylvie's husband
- Nicholas – June's and Hector's son
- Reverend Han – a man who has taken care of orphans
- Min – an orphan who becomes Hector's friend
