= Brian Goldstone =

American journalist, cultural anthropologist, and author

- Born: 1980 (age 45–46)
- Education: Duke University
- Occupations: Journalist, Anthropologist, Author
- Writing career
- Genre: Nonfiction
- Notable works: There Is No Place For Us: Working and Homeless in America
- Notable awards: 2026 Pulitzer Prize for General Nonfiction Los Angeles Times Book Prize
- Website: https://www.briangoldstone.net/about

Brian Goldstone is an American journalist, cultural anthropologist, and author. He is best known for his 2025 debut nonfiction book, There Is No Place For Us: Working and Homeless in America which won the 2026 Pulitzer Prize for General Nonfiction and the Los Angeles Times Book Prize.

== Education and academic Career ==
Goldstone holds a PhD in cultural anthropology from Duke University. Earlier in his career, he worked as a Mellon Research Fellow at Columbia University. Between 2015 and 2016, he was a Justice-in-Education Fellow at Columbia University, where he taught at Sing Sing prison. In 2021, he was a National Fellow at New America. He has also received grants and fellowships from the Luce Foundation, Fulbright, the Wenner-Gren Foundation, and the American Council of Learned Societies. In May 2026, he was named a Fellow with the Watchdog Writers Group at the Missouri School of Journalism and in October 2026, Goldstone joined Duke University as Writer-in-Residence.

== Writing Career ==
Goldstone's journalism and essays on poverty, housing insecurity, and social policy have appeared in publications including The New York Times, Harper's Magazine, The New Republic, and The California Sunday Magazine.

Goldstone's reporting on working families experiencing homelessness in Atlanta for The New Republic served as the foundation for his debut book. He expanded this reporting—largely developed during his 2021 fellowship at New America—into his debut nonfiction book, There Is No Place for Us: Working and Homeless in America, published in 2025. Following the lives of five working families in Atlanta, the book examines gentrification, low-wage labor, and housing precarity in the United States.

There Is No Place for Us received widespread critical acclaim. It was named one of the 10 Best Books of 2025 by The New York Times and The Atlantic, and was a finalist for the Carnegie Medal for Excellence in Nonfiction. In 2026, the book won the Pulitzer Prize for General Nonfiction and the Los Angeles Times Book Prize. Following its publication, Goldstone began researching a second book focused on systemic gaps in the American mental health care system.

== Works ==
- There Is No Place For Us:Working and Homeless In America
