= Kristen Radtke =

American writer and illustrator

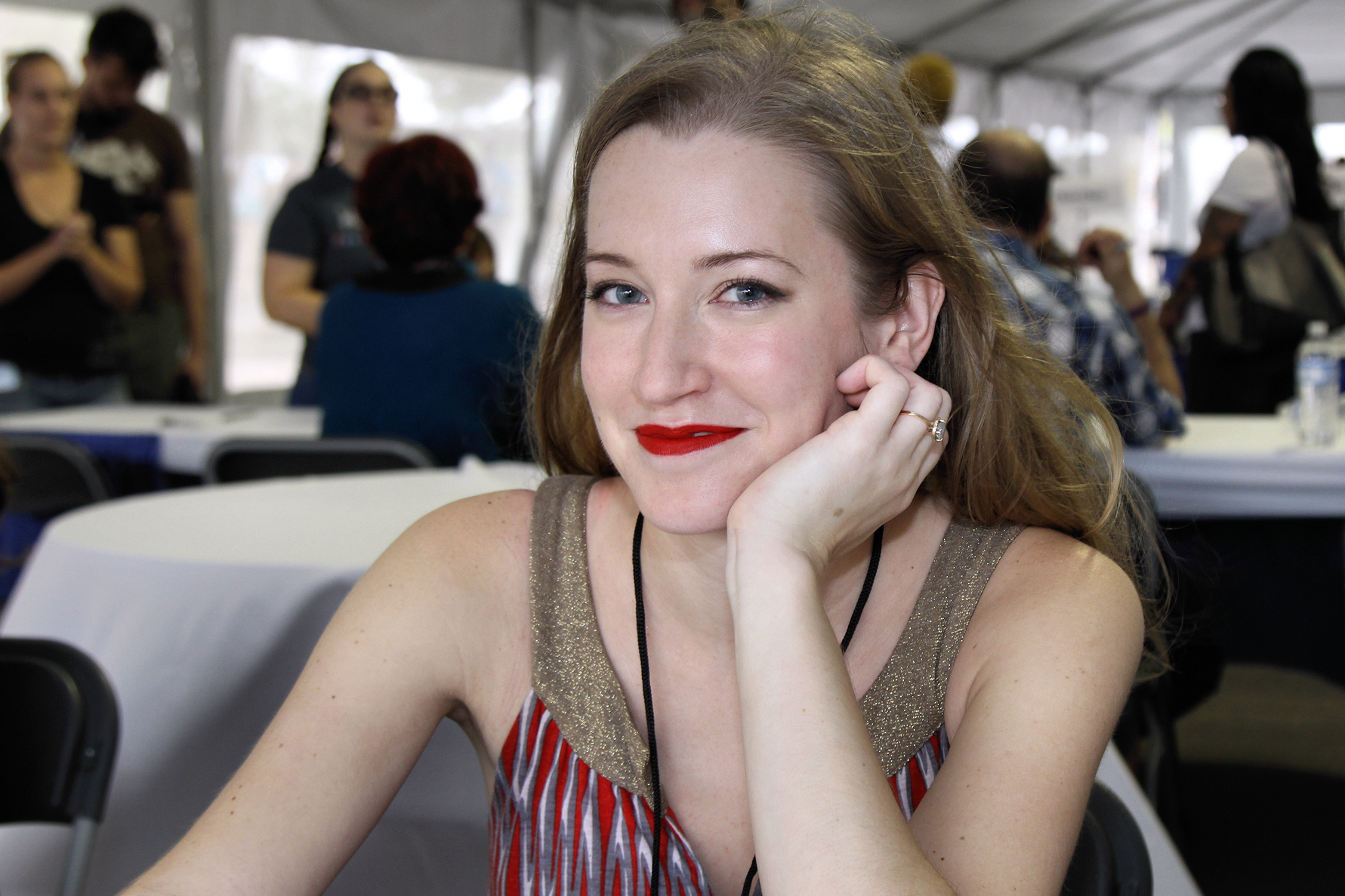
- Radtke at the 2017 Texas Book Festival
- Born: Kristen Radtke; June 25, 1987 (age 39); Green Bay, Wisconsin
- Occupations: Writer; Illustrator
- Writing career
- Notable works: Imagine Wanting Only This, Seek You: A Journey Through American Loneliness

Kristen Radtke (born June 25, 1987) is a writer and illustrator based in Brooklyn, New York. Her graphic memoir, Imagine Wanting Only This, was published by Pantheon Books in April 2017. It was described by The Atlantic as "a breathtaking mix of prose and illustration."

Radtke's second book, Seek You: A Journey Through American Loneliness was published in July 2021. NPR.org said: "The beauty of Seek You is that it feels like a communal experience. Reading this book is reading about ourselves and our lives." The book was awarded a 2019 Whiting Creative Nonfiction Grant. It was also shortlisted for the 2022 Andrew Carnegie Medal for Excellence in Nonfiction.

Radtke is currently creative director for The Verge. Previously, she was art director and deputy publisher of The Believer magazine, managing editor of Sarabande Books, and the film and video editor of TriQuarterly magazine. She has an MFA from the University of Iowa's Nonfiction Writing Program. In 2017, she was named "A Face to Watch" by the Los Angeles Times.

Radtke's writing and comics have appeared in publications including The New Yorker, The New York Times Book Review, The Atlantic, GQ, Oxford American, and Virginia Quarterly Review.

== Selected works ==
- Imagine Wanting Only This (Graphic Memoir, 2017; Pantheon Graphic Novels) ISBN 1101870834
- Seek You: A Journey Through American Loneliness (Graphic Nonfiction, 2021; Pantheon Graphic Novels) ISBN 9781524748067
