= On Such a Full Sea =

2014 novel by Chang-Rae Lee

- Author: Chang-Rae Lee
- Language: English
- Genre: Speculative Fiction, Post-Apocalyptic Fiction, Dystopian Fiction
- Publisher: Riverhead Books
- Publication date: January 7, 2014
- Publication place: United States
- Media type: Print (hardcover, paperback)
- Pages: 407
- ISBN: 9781594486104

On Such a Full Sea is a speculative fiction novel by Chang-rae Lee, published on January 7, 2014, by Riverhead Books. It is Lee's fifth novel, and the story uses the first person plural to tell the journey of the young fish tank diver, Fan, as she pursues her missing boyfriend. The novel takes place in a post-apocalyptic dystopian world ruined by environmental disaster where the population is divided between those who live in Charter villages, highly regulated and self-contained labor settlements, and the open counties, land that is full of crime and unsupervised by the government. The entire population also is afflicted with "C," a disease affecting the rest of the population that eventually kills everyone who has it. The work deals with themes of capitalism, environmental concerns, healthcare, race, and postcolonialism. It received positive reception at the time of its release, and was a finalist for the National Book Critics Circle Award for Fiction in 2014 as well as shortlisted for the 2015 Andrew Carnegie Medal for Excellence in Fiction.

== Background and Publication History ==
Initially, this novel was meant to be a social realist piece about Chinese manual workers in Shenzhen, centering on their code of conduct and psyche. However, after returning from a research trip to China where he toured a factory, Lee's direction for the novel evolved because he did not believe that his novel could provide a comprehensive rendering that would offer anything fresh to the topic. Although Lee still incorporated the communal sensibility that drew him initially to the communities of Chinese factory workers, he decided to focus on the idea of re-populating the abandoned urban areas of America after a train he was on passed through a neglected part of Baltimore. Additionally, Lee drew upon the bright, yet fanatical order of Singapore to create the Charter villages, and the protagonist of his work was influenced by his desire to create a heroine who his two daughters might identify with. The line "On such a full sea are we now afloat; / And we must take the current when it serves, / Or lose our ventures" from William Shakespeare's Julius Caesar serves as the inspiration for the title of the novel.

== Plot summary ==
The novel begins in the Charter village of B-Mor, formerly Baltimore, in a world afflicted by the disease "C" as the collective narrator reminisces on Fan's absence. Fan was a dedicated fish tank diver who was close to her boyfriend, Reg. However, Reg disappears one day with no explanation after being summoned to speak to a manager before the start of a work week. In the following days, Fan withdraws from her friends and work acquaintances. She ultimately decides to quietly leave B-Mor to search for her boyfriend in the aftermath of a big flood that kills one of Reg's younger friends.

Fan begins her search by travelling westward via old roads into the anarchic open counties. However, she collapses in a ditch during a downpour, and Quig and Loreen find her crumpled form. They decide to bring her with them to the Smokes, a settlement in the open counties where they both live; Quig drugs her and shoves her into the trunk of his station wagon. Upon arriving at the Smokes, Quig takes care of her injured leg, and Fan is kept locked in a room of spare parts while she recovers. Loreen quickly expresses her dislike towards Fan's presence. In the ensuing days, there is an incident where she beats Fan until Quig intervenes and knocks Loreen out. In the aftermath of this incident, Loreen's son, Sewey, begins to bring Fan food and drink. Loreen continues to beat and humiliates Fan during her stay in the open country compound.

After some time passes, Quig needs to travel through the barren Northeast to get medicine for Sewey. He takes Fan with them, and Fan bonds with Quig over driving lessons. Fan learns about the death of Quig's wife and daughter that lead him to leave his Charter village and create the Smokes. After a car accident, they seek shelter with the Nickelmans, a family performing troupe who decide that they want Fan to stay with them. The Nickelmans drug Quig and attempt to gut him, but they manage to narrowly escape. Ultimately, they reach the Charter village of Seneca, and Fan becomes an indentured servant to Mister Leo and Miss Cathy after Quig trades her for needed medicine. Mister Leo attempts to rape Fan, and Miss Cathy attacks him, leaving Mister Leo with brain damage. Miss Cathy decides to keep Fan with the seven Asian girls she keeps in her chambers.

The other girls kept by Miss Cathy want to help Fan escape, so two of them poison themselves. Fan leaves with Vik, the doctor who comes to treat the girls who develop botulism as a result of their efforts. Vik takes Fan to a party where she meets Betty and Oliver. After deciding to leave the party with them, she finds out that Oliver is her older brother, Liwei, who tested out of B-Mor. He now works as a medical researcher trying to cure the C-illness that plagues the population. He shares that Reg was taken by a pharmaceutical company because he is free of C, the disease that plagues everyone in the world of the novel. It is also revealed that Fan is pregnant with Reg's child, and Liwei decides that he will sell Fan to a pharmaceutical company because the baby could inherit Reg's C-free status. After learning of Liwei's plans, Betty works with Vik to rescue Fan from her brother, and the novel ends as they escape.

== Characters ==
=== B-Mor ===
- Fan — Fan is the primary protagonist of the novel. She is a quiet, but intelligent sixteen years old who the narrator notes is small, standing at only 150 centimeters (4.92 ft.). She is originally from B-Mor, and she was a dedicated and capable fish tank diver who spent more time in the aquarium tanks than others. Over the course of the novel, she demonstrates her persistence and strong will as she pursues Reg.
- Reg — Reg is Fan's boyfriend, and he was a worker in the grow facility off B-Mor. His unexplained disappearance sparks Fan's departure from B-Mor. It is later reveled that he is mysteriously free of "C," which affects everyone else and ultimately causes their deaths.
- Liwei (Oliver) — Liwei, also known as Oliver, is Fan's older brother who tested out of B-Mor. He is a medical researcher who is working to develop a cure to the C-illness. When he discovers that Fan is pregnant with child, he intends to sell her to a pharmaceutical company.

=== The Smokes ===
- Quig — Quig is an exile from another Charter community who has become the leader of the Smokes. He is a big, broad man in his fifties with a dark beard, bald head, and tattoos. He is intimidating, but he takes care of Fan when she is injured. He also briefly becomes Fan's traveling companion.
- Loreen — Loreen is the matriarch of the Smokes. She is a heavier woman with long, scraggly hair and crooked hair. She is ill-tempered and treats Fan poorly during her stay.
- Sewey — Sewey is Loreen's son. He is thought to be thirteen years old, and he brings Fan food while she recovers from her injured leg. He is very curious about B-Mor, and he asks her questions about what life was like in the Charter village.

=== The Northeast ===
- The Nickelmans — The Nickelmans are a family performing troupe. They want Fan to be part of their traveling circus, and they drug and attempt to gut Quig in their efforts to accomplish this.

=== Seneca ===
- Miss Cathy — Miss Cathy is a resident of the Charter village of Seneca.
- Mister Leo — Mister Leo is another resident of Seneca.
- One through Seven — One, Two, Three, Four, Five, Six, and Seven are the other Asian girls who are "kept" alongside Fan and serve as indentured servants to Miss Cathy.
- Vik — Vik is a doctor. He comes to treat the girls kept by Miss Cathy who contract botulism, and he helps rescue Fan.
- Betty — Betty is Liwei's wife, who has been having an affair with Vik, and she helps rescue Fan at the end of the novel.

== Genre ==
On Such a Full Sea is a work of speculative fiction that leans heavily into post-apocalyptic fiction and dystopian fiction genres. The reviewer Ellah Allfrey states that On Such a Full Sea fits into what readers would expect from speculative fiction, like the Oryx and Crake trilogy by Margaret Atwood and The Road by Cormac McCarthy, because it is "an America inhabited by people often beyond the point of crisis. It is a moral landscape replete with circumstances that magnify the worst of humanity, and the very best."

== Style ==
On Such a Full Sea is written in the first person plural, and the collective "we" is the community of B-Mor. The first person plural narrator tells the story of Fan from an unspecified point in the future after her adventure, and as a result, the reader is not given insight into Fan's own thoughts and feelings. This feature of the narration also leads to simplifications and conflations of details of Fan's journey. Furthermore, the inflected cadence of this narrative style reflects how even decades after the first immigrants' arrival, the close-knit ties of the B-Mor community persist.

== Reception ==
=== Reviews ===
On Such a Full Sea received starred reviews from Booklist, Publishers Weekly, and Kirkus Reviews, as well as positive reviews from The New York Times Book Review, Shelf Awareness, and NPR.

Kirkus Reviews called the book "Welcome and surprising proof that there’s plenty of life in end-of-the-world storytelling," and Thuy Dinh of Shelf Awareness praised it as "Hauntingly familiar yet dazzlingly subversive" and highlighted that the novel "grafts ethnic otherness to iconic Americana." In her review, NPR's Ellah Allfrey wrote that Lee "demonstrates once again that he is a writer of great imagination and stylistic elegance" with "a lightness of touch and a deft narration that is original and multi-layered." She also stated that "Here, for me, is Lee's mastery — On Such a Full Sea is a book that involves the reader fully in the act of telling the story. There was no point at which I felt I was merely a passive listener and this is a rare experience."

The audiobook, narrated by BD Wong, also received positive reviews from Booklist and Library Journal. In fact, Nann Blaine Hilyard of Library Journal wrote, "That versatility ensures [On Such a Full Sea will see] equal appreciation among readers who enjoy a heart-thumping adventure and doctoral students in search of a superlative dissertation text."

=== Awards and honors ===
Notably, On Such a Full Sea was a finalist for the National Book Critics Circle Award for Fiction in 2014. The novel also was shortlisted for the 2015 Andrew Carnegie Medal for Excellence in Fiction.

Below is a chart that highlights major awards and recognitions On Such a Full Sea has received.

Awards for On Such a Full Sea
Year	Award	Result	Ref.
2014	Booklist Editors' Choice for Adult Fiction	Selection	
2014	National Book Critics Circle Award for Fiction	Finalist	
2015	Andrew Carnegie Medal for Excellence in Fiction	Shortlist	
2015	Reference and User Services Association's Notable Fiction	Selection	
