= Native Speaker (novel) =

1995 novel by Chang-Rae Lee

- Author: Chang-Rae Lee
- Language: English
- Genre: Literary fiction
- Publisher: Riverhead Books
- Publication date: 1995
- Publication place: United States
- Media type: Print (paperback)
- Pages: 368 pp (first edition, paperback)
- ISBN: 978-1573225311
- OCLC: 38863471

Native Speaker (1995) is the debut novel of Chang-Rae Lee which explores the life of a Korean-American man named Henry Park as he navigates his marriage and career as a spy. Native Speaker explores the themes of language, identity, and culture as an Asian-American, and is considered a literary fiction as well as a spy thriller. The novel won the 1996 PEN/Hemingway award for Best First Novel, and though not the first novel by a Korean American author to be published by a major American publisher (that honor belongs to East Goes West, by Younghill Kang, Scribner's, 1935) it is the first contemporary novel in that category, published by Riverhead Books.

== Synopsis ==
Native Speaker follows Henry Park, a Korean-American living in New York City during the 90s. Henry struggles with the recent separation from his wife, Lelia, who is white, following the death of their seven-year-old son. He also works at Glimmer & Co., a firm hired by clients to gather information on various subjects, typically immigrants and people of color. As a spy, Henry is tasked with the job of going undercover to investigate John Kwang, a Korean-American councilman and potential candidate for the next mayoral race. While Henry starts to gain Kwang's trust, he begins grappling with the implications of his impending betrayal, knowing that his actions will harm a fellow Korean American.

== Characters ==
=== The Park family ===
- Henry Park: As a child, Henry was born in America to two Korean immigrants. His Korean name is Byong-ho. Employed at Glimmer and Co., he works as an industrial spy and is currently tasked with investigating John Kwang.
- Lelia Park: Henry's estranged wife who is a speech therapist from a wealthy, Scottish-American East Coast family. She met Henry at a party during one of his initial assignments.
- Mitt Park: Henry and Lelia's son, who died at the age of seven.
- Mr. Park: Henry's father, a strict man who was once an industrial engineer in Korea, but became the owner and operator of a greengrocer chain in New York. He died a year and a half after Mitt.
- Mrs. Park: Henry's mother, who died from cancer when Henry was ten.
- Maid (Ahjuma): A woman from Korea, who flew to New York after being hired by Mr. Park to cook, clean, and care for Henry.
- Stew: Lelia's father, who lives in a beach house in Maine.

=== John Kwang's family and staff ===
- John Kwang: A Korean-American councilman, who is a potential candidate for Mayor of New York City. He becomes a father figure to Henry.
- May: John's wife, an immigrant from Korea. She met and married John Kwang in America.
- Peter Kwang: Son of John and May and John Jr.'s older brother.
- John Kwang Jr: Son of John and May and Peter's younger brother.
- Sherrie Chin-Watt: John Kwang's PR assistant. She is Chinese-American and married to a European-American banker. Sherrie is later revealed to be having an affair with Kwang.
- Janice Pawlowsky: John Kwang's scheduling manager, and Sherrie's protégé. She is a civil attorney, originally from Chicago.
- Eduardo Fermin: A Dominican college student who is a devoted volunteer for Kwang's campaign. He dies when a bomb explodes at Kwang's campaign headquarters. It is later revealed that Kwang suspected Eduardo of being a spy for the current mayor of New York City, De Roos.
- Cameron Jenkins: One of Kwang's staffers.

=== Glimmer & Co. ===
- Dennis Hoagland: Henry's boss and the founder of Glimmer & Co.
- Jack: Henry's best friend and coworker who used to work for the CIA. Jack is a Greek-American.
- Sophie: Jack's Sicilian wife, who died from cervical cancer.
- Pete Ichibata: A Japanese coworker known for crude jokes and excessive drinking.
- Grace: One of Henry's coworkers.

=== Others ===
- Emile Luzan: One of Henry's failed assignments, a Filipino-American therapist whom Henry ended up befriending. Luzan helped Henry recover from Mitt's death.
- Mayor De Roos: The current Democratic mayor of New York City and one of Kwang's opponents.
- Molly: Lelia's friend and an artist. During Henry and Lelia's separation, Lelia stays in Molly's apartment.

== Major themes ==
Henry is the quintessential Korean-American, as much of his Korean heritage resonates through his voice, personality, and beliefs. His Korean upbringing still shows up in his adult life. Like many American immigrants trying to find an identity in a foreign land, Henry is an "...emotional alien...stranger [and] follower..." who constantly feels isolated from the country in which he lives and also the country from which he came. Even though he is American, Henry Park feels a constant alienation and sense of isolation. There are many challenges that come with fitting into American life because of the difference in culture, beliefs, behavior; and because of the desire to still hold on to one's heritage.

== Awards and nominations ==
- PEN/Hemingway Award for Best First Novel (1996)
- Barnes & Noble Discover Great New Writers Award
- American Book Award (1996)
- QPB New Visions Award
- Oregon Book Award
- ALA Notable Book

== In popular culture ==
The novel is referenced in the film Estuaries by German director Lior Shamriz, in a scene between the protagonist's sister Ronit and her therapist. In a conversation about diaspora and exile, Ronit refers to Los Angeles as "what Chung Rae-Lee called the Last Babylon".
