= Megha Majumdar =

Indian writer

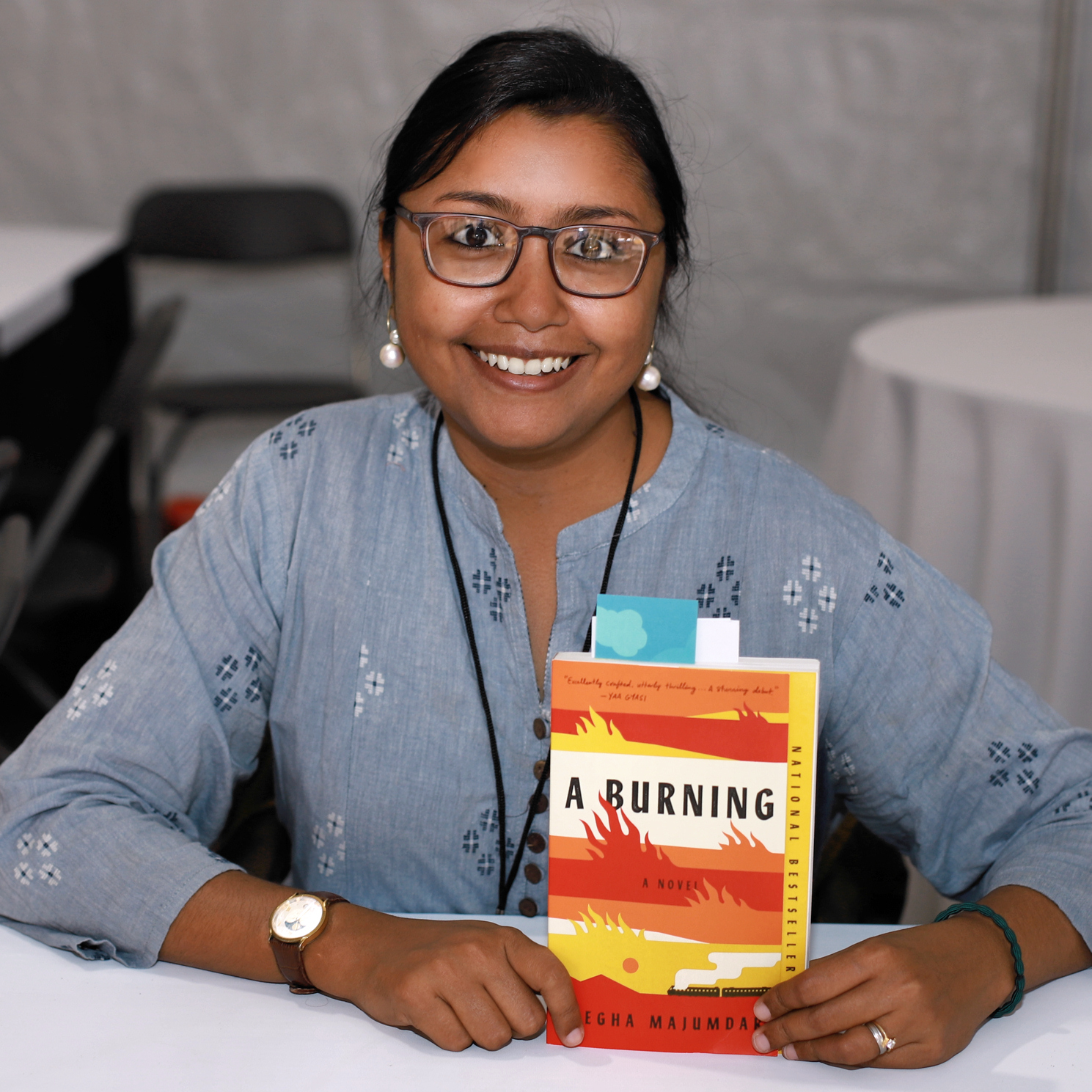
- Majumdar at the 2022 Texas Book Festival.
- Born: 1987 or 1988 (age 38–39); Kolkata, India
- Education: Harvard University (AB); Johns Hopkins University
- Occupations: Writer, editor
- Writing career
- Notable works: A Burning; A Guardian and a Thief
- Notable awards: Yuva Puraskar 2021; Whiting Award 2022; Guggenheim Fellow 2026
- Website: meghamajumdar.com

Megha Majumdar (born 1987/1988) is an Indian novelist who lives in New York City. Her debut novel, A Burning, was a New York Times best seller, winning the Sahitya Akademi Yuva Puraskar award in 2021 and a Whiting Award in 2022.

== Early life ==
Majumdar was born in Kolkata, India. In 2006, she moved to the United States to study social anthropology at Harvard University, where she graduated with a Bachelor of Arts in 2010. She went on to complete her graduate studies at Johns Hopkins University, earning a master's degree in anthropology.

== Career ==
Majumdar's debut novel, A Burning, was released in 2020 and became a New York Times best seller. Ron Charles of The Washington Post wrote Majumdar "demonstrates an uncanny ability to capture the vast scope of a tumultuous society by attending to the hopes and fears of people living on the margins. The effect is transporting, often thrilling, finally harrowing. It’s no wonder this propulsive novel was chosen for the Today Show book club and leaped immediately onto the bestseller list." In TIME, Naina Bajekal described the novel as "a powerful corrective to the political narratives that have dominated in contemporary India."

In 2020, Majumdar told The Wall Street Journal, "I hope the questions [I ask in the book] don’t appear contained in India and...that readers here are able to think of contemporary America too." Majumdar's writing style has been compared to that of Jhumpa Lahiri and Yaa Gyasi.

At the time of her novel's publication, Majumdar worked as an editor at Catapult Books in New York City. In 2021, Majumdar was promoted to Editor-in-Chief of Catapult, and her authors included Matthew Salesses, Randa Jarrar, Ruby Hamad, Sindya Bhanoo, and Ye Chun. In May 2022, she left the position to focus on her writing and teaching.

== Honors and awards ==
A Burning was shortlisted for the 2021 Andrew Carnegie Medal for Fiction, and won a Yuva Puraskar award from the Sahitya Akademi in 2021. In April 2022 Majumdar won a Whiting Award. A Burning was also longlisted for the 2020 National Book Award for Fiction.

Majumdar won the 2026 Andrew Carnegie Medal for Excellence in Fiction for her second novel, A Guardian and a Thief. The novel was shortlisted for the 2025 National Book Award for Fiction and the 2026 Carol Shields Prize for Fiction.

She is a recipient of the 2026 Guggenheim Fellowship in Fiction.

She is the 2026-2027 Rona Jaffe Foundation Fellow at the Cullman Center for Scholars and Writers at the New York Public Library.

== Bibliography ==
- A Burning, New York : Alfred A. Knopf, 2020. ISBN 9780525658696
- A Guardian and a Thief, New York: Alfred A. Knopf, 2025. ISBN 9780593804872
