= A Burning =

2020 novel by Megha Majumdar

- First edition (Knopf, 2020)
- Author: Megha Majumdar
- Language: English
- Set in: Kolkata, India
- Publisher: Alfred A. Knopf
- Publication date: 2 June 2020
- Media type: Print: hardback
- Pages: 304
- ISBN: 9780525658696
- LC Class: PS3613.A35388

A Burning is the debut novel by Indian-born author Megha Majumdar released in June 2020. By December 2020, the novel was on 13 lists of the best books of 2020, according to Literary Hub.

== Plot ==
Set in Kolkata, India, the novel tells the story of its central character Jivan, a young woman who witnesses a terrorist attack on an Indian train while it is stopped in a station. Jivan posts to Facebook the next day, drawing the attention of police who arrest her on suspicion of committing the terrorist attack. Following the accusation, her fate hinges upon her former gym teacher, PT Sir, who has become a politician in an Indian right-wing party, and on a hijra actress named Lovely.

== Background ==
In a 2020 interview with The Wall Street Journal, Majumdar explained the origin of the novel:

I think it came from reading the news and watching what was happening in India. I grew up in India, and my family’s still there. The right wing was ascendant, and communal tensions were being whipped up. [The country] was going in a direction that was really frightening. It’s truly contrary to this ideal of India that we were taught about since we were kids, the country whose plurality and diversity we were taught to celebrate. So I wanted to write about how individuals survive such a societal turn.

== Critical reception ==
Ron Charles of The Washington Post wrote Majumdar "demonstrates an uncanny ability to capture the vast scope of a tumultuous society by attending to the hopes and fears of people living on the margins. The effect is transporting, often thrilling, finally harrowing. It’s no wonder this propulsive novel was chosen for the Today Show book club and leaped immediately onto the bestseller list." Grace Z. Li wrote for USA Today, "Majumdar's powerful debut is carefully crafted for maximum impact, carving out the most urgent parts of its characters for the whole world to see." In the Star Tribune, Anjali Enjeti wrote it "is a penetrating exposé about how the possibilities of fame and fortune gradually erode one’s integrity." James Woods wrote in The New Yorker, "Majumdar’s novel is compelling, yet its compulsions have to do with an immersive present rather than with a skidding sequence. Her characters start telling us about their lives, and those lives are suddenly palpable, vital, voiced." Tabish Khair wrote in The Hindu, "It is an excellent novel and an impressive debut", but notes that some errors are made in depicting the Muslim protagonists: "I grew up a Muslim who knew much about Hindu details of life but met excellent, well-meaning Hindus, including some of my school friends, who seemed to know nothing about Muslim details of life. And hence, I cannot help but notice this aridity in A Burning. And because the author of A Burning is a person of unusual talent and empathy, I want to bring it to her notice."

Susan Choi wrote in The New York Times, "Majumdar is so far from exoticizing her setting as to be almost too economical, leaving the reader to snatch at clues where she can as to political, social and cultural context," and "Majumdar excels at depicting the workings of power on the powerless; for her characters, power is no abstract concept but a visceral assault on the body and its senses." In The Indian Express, Paromita Chakrabarti wrote the novel "is a quiet, searing study of the underclass and the aspiring middle class in India, whose tentative stake in the capitalist economy is complicated by the many tyrannies of gender, religion and class endemic to society." Harsimran Gill wrote for Scroll.in, "when Majumdar inhabits the perspective of Lovely, she falters. In stark contrast to the other characters, Lovely is given a peculiar voice and broken English for the entirety of the novel. [...] It’s a perplexing choice for a character whose story seems to have otherwise been crafted with care and thoughtfulness." Chakrabarti described restrictions on the teaching of English in government-funded primary schools in West Bengal that began in 1981 and extended for nearly two decades, and how therefore, "entire generations grew up with a shaky hold over the language," and wrote, "Majumdar packs in layers of history in her idiosyncratic use of the English language."

Naina Bajekal wrote in Time, "Megha Majumdar presents a powerful corrective to the political narratives that have dominated in contemporary India." In The Financial Express, Ashutosh Bhardwaj describes the novel as "a disappointment, to say the least," and "just a mild stab at contemporary India that gets contended by perfunctory outlines and makes little attempt to capture the country in its nuances and complexities." In Newslaundry, Anand Vardhan writes, "In many ways, A Burning runs out of steam in elevating itself to the ambition of literature. Despite sporadic sparks of promise, it fails to look beyond the blind spots that abound in contemporary narratives on India." Amrita Dutta writes in The Indian Express, "Majumdar's economy of style and language extends, unfortunately, to an economy of specificities and details – one that produces an attenuated version of the complex, violent remaking of India, a version that is evidently easier on Western critics and publishing cultures." In a mixed review, Kirkus Reviews notes, "Jivan’s storyline feels a bit thin, seemingly purpose-built to make a point about the very real injustices of being poor and a member of a hated religious minority...The novel’s brilliant individual vignettes far outshine a rather flimsy overarching plot."

Rihan Najib writes in The Hindu Business Line, "Though the novel is adept at essaying contemporary Indian realities — taking on an Arundhati Roy-esque array of social justice issues such as development-induced displacement, Islamophobia, media trials, transphobia, income inequality, cow vigilantism — it does so with the broadest possible brush. [...] Nevertheless, Majumdar’s talents as a writer of the times is undeniable and she is certain to reach higher echelons of literary fame." Political anthropologist Irfan Ahmad wrote an extensive critique of the novel in The Caravan, stating, "What the novel does best is make visible what is starkly absent from the mainstream debates: state terrorism", and "It shifts the focus onto the terror of the state and its machinery, [...] But its description of this world, unlike that of the Urdu fiction, lacks the depth of cultural experience of what it means to be projected as a Muslim terrorist."

== Honors and awards ==
- Shortlist, 2021 Andrew Carnegie Medal for Excellence in Fiction
- April 2022 Whiting Award
