= We Were Once A Family =

2023 non-fiction book by Roxanna Asgarian

We Were Once A Family: A Story of Love, Death, and Child Removal in America
- Author: Roxanna Asgarian
- Language: English
- Genre: Non-fiction
- Publication date: 2023
- Publication place: United States

We Were Once A Family: A Story of Love, Death, and Child Removal in America is a 2023 non-fiction book by Roxanna Asgarian.

The title refers to the birth families of the victims of the Hart family murders. It describes how children were removed from their birth families and given to the Harts. Asgarian chose to focus on the birth families instead of the Harts. The book includes criticism towards the foster care authorities, which the author described as "unaccountable" in regards to its failures to protect the children adopted by the Harts.

== Background ==
As of 2023 Asgarian is employed by The Texas Tribune and writes articles about the legal system. When the Hart murders occurred, Asgarian worked in the Houston area. Asgarian had contacted a birth relative, who had not been informed by law enforcement about the fate of the children, after doing research. Asgarian interviewed an aunt of another set of children. Authorities identified the remains of Hannah Hart by using research done by Asgarian.

== Reception ==
It won a 2023 Los Angeles Times Annual Book Prize and the 2023 National Book Critics Circle Award for Nonfiction.

Jennifer Szalai, in The New York Times, described the book as "harrowing".

Marcela Davidson Avilés of National Public Radio described the contents as "tenacious and vulnerable".

Jessica Winter, in The New Yorker described the book as "moving and superbly reported".
