= Chang-Rae Lee =

Korean-American novelist (born 1965)

Chang-rae Lee
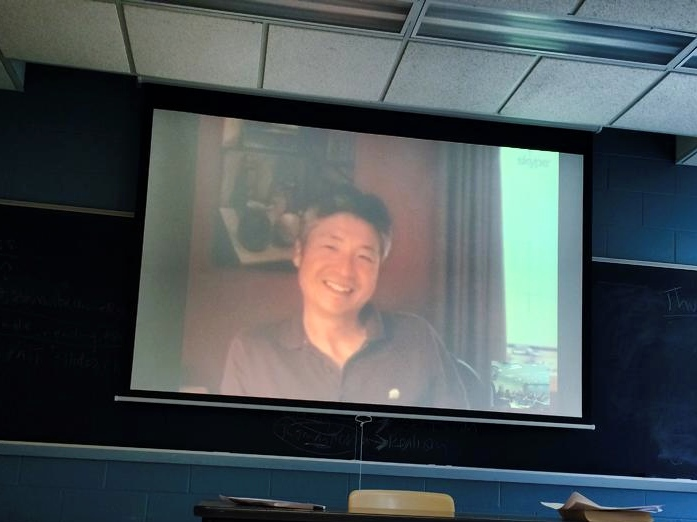
- Chang-rae Lee speaks to a University of Michigan class about his novel On Such a Full Sea.
- Born: July 29, 1965 (age 61); South Korea
- Education: Yale University (BA); University of Oregon (MFA)
- Occupation: Novelist
- Spouse: Michelle Branca (1993–present)
- Writing career
- Notable works: Native Speaker; Aloft
- Notable awards: Hemingway Foundation/PEN Award; Asian/Pacific American Award for Literature; Asian American Literary Awards

Korean name
- Hangul: 이창래
- Hanja: 李昌來
- RR: I Changrae
- MR: I Ch'angnae

Chang-rae Lee (born July 29, 1965) is a Korean-American novelist and a professor of creative writing at Stanford University. He was previously Professor of Creative Writing at Princeton University and director of Princeton's Program in Creative Writing.

== Early life ==
Lee was born in South Korea in 1965 to Young Yong and Inja Hong Lee. He immigrated to the United States with his family when he was 3 years old to join his father, who was then a psychiatric resident and later established a successful practice in Westchester County, New York. In a 1999 interview with Ferdinand M. De Leon, Lee described his childhood as "a standard suburban American upbringing," in which he attended Phillips Exeter Academy in Exeter, New Hampshire, before earning a B.A. in English at Yale University in 1987. After working as an equities analyst on Wall Street for a year, he enrolled at the University of Oregon. With the manuscript for Native Speaker as his thesis, he received a Master of Fine Arts degree in writing in 1993 and became an assistant professor of creative writing at the university. On 19 June 1993 Lee married architect Michelle Branca, with whom he has two daughters. The success of his debut novel, Native Speaker, led Lee to move to Hunter College, where he was hired to direct and teach in the creative writing program.

== Career ==
Lee's first novel, Native Speaker (1995), won numerous awards including the PEN/Hemingway Award for Debut Novel. Centered on a Korean-American industrial spy, the novel explores themes of alienation and betrayal as experienced by immigrants and first-generation citizens in their struggle to assimilate in American life. In 1999, he published his second novel, A Gesture Life. This elaborates on themes of identity and assimilation through the narrative of an elderly Japanese immigrant in the United States who was born in Korea but later adopted to a Japanese family and remembers treating Korean comfort women during World War II. For this book, Lee received an Asian American Literary Award. His 2004 novel Aloft received mixed reviews from critics and featured Lee's first protagonist who is not Asian-American, but instead a disengaged and isolated Italian-American suburbanite. It received the 2005-2006 Asian/Pacific American Award for Literature in the Adult Literature category. His 2010 novel The Surrendered won the 2011 Dayton Literary Peace Prize and was a finalist for the 2011 Pulitzer Prize for Fiction. Lee's next novel, On Such a Full Sea (2014), is set in a dystopian future version Baltimore, Maryland, called B-Mor, where the main character, Fan, is a Chinese-American laborer working as a diver in a fish farm. It was a finalist for the 2014 National Book Critics Circle Award for Fiction.

In 2016, Lee joined the faculty of Stanford University, where he is the Ward W. and Priscilla B. Woods Professor of English. He previously taught creative writing in the Lewis Center for the Arts at Princeton University. He was also a Shinhan Distinguished Visiting Professor at Yonsei University in Seoul, South Korea.

Lee explores issues central to the Asian-American experience: the legacy of the past; the encounter of diverse cultures; the challenges of racism, discrimination, and exclusion; dreams achieved and dreams deferred. Lee's writings have addressed the questions of identity, exile, diaspora, assimilation, and alienation.

== Awards and honors ==
Year	Title	Award	Category	Result	Ref.
1995	Native Speaker	Barnes & Noble Discover Great New Writers Award	—	Won	
1996	Native Speaker	PEN/Hemingway Award for Debut Novel	—	Won	
2000	A Gesture Life	Anisfield-Wolf Book Award	Fiction	Won	
2000	A Gesture Life	NAIBA Book of the Year Award	—	Won	
2006	Aloft	Asian/Pacific American Award for Literature	Fiction	Won	
2011	The Surrendered	Dayton Literary Peace Prize	—	Won	
2011	The Surrendered	Pulitzer Prize	Fiction	Finalist	
2015	On Such a Full Sea	ALA Notable Books	Adult Fiction	Selection	
2017	—	John Dos Passos Prize	—	Won	

== Bibliography ==
=== Books ===
- Native Speaker (Riverhead Books, 1994)
- A Gesture Life (Riverhead Books, 1999)
- Aloft (Riverhead Books, 2004)
- The Surrendered (Riverhead Books, 2010)
- On Such a Full Sea (Riverhead Books, 2014)
- My Year Abroad (Riverhead Books, 2021)
- A Tender Age (Riverhead Books, 2026)

=== Articles and book chapters ===
- "The Faintest Echo of Our Language". The New England Review. 15 (3): 85–93. Summer 1993. doi:10.1056/NEJM183609140150601. JSTOR 40242683.
- "Coming Home Again". The New Yorker. October 9, 1995.
- "Mute in an English-only World". In Shreve, Susan Richards, ed. (2003). Dream Me Home Safely. Houghton Mifflin Harcourt. ISBN 978-0-618-37902-6.
- "Gut Course: Manhattan". The New Yorker. 88 (38): 72–73. December 3, 2012.
- "Sea Urchin". First Tastes. August 19 & 26, 2002. The New Yorker. 97 (27): 39. September 6, 2021. (Note: Online version is titled "How Sea Urchin Tastes". First published in the August 19&26, 2002 issue.)

=== Screenplays ===
- Coming Home Again (co-written and directed by Wayne Wang, 2019)
- Gold Mountain (based on How Much of These Hills Is Gold by C Pam Zhang, directed by Ang Lee, TBA)

———————
