= New American Voices Award =

Literary award

- Awarded for: books that illuminate in some way the immigrant experience
- First award: 2018
- Website: IIR

The New American Voices Award is the literary prize conferred by the Institute for Immigrant Research for "recently published works that illuminate the complexity of human experience as told by immigrants."

== History ==
It was first established in 2018, and as of 2024 the IIR has named seven winners. They receive $5,000, while finalists in the shortlist earn $1,000.

== Winning titles ==
Year	Title	Author	Ref.
2018	In the Distance	Hernan Diaz	
2019	The Affairs of the Falcóns	Melissa Rivero	
2020	The Son of Good Fortune	Lysley Tenorio	
2021	Infinite Country	Patricia Engel	
2022	Seeking Fortune Elsewhere	Sindya Bhanoo	
2023	The Great Reclamation	Rachel Heng	
2024	Airplane Mode	Shahnaz Habib	
