= Shangyang Fang =

Chinese poet

Shangyang Fang is a Chinese poet. Writing in both English and Chinese, he is the author of Burying the Mountain, a debut poetry collection published by Copper Canyon Press in 2021. He attended the Michener Center for Writers and subsequently received a Stegner Fellowship from Stanford University. His name, Shangyang, refers to a mythological one-legged bird whose dance brought rain and flood.

== Early life ==
Fang was born in Chengdu, China and was raised by various family members, including his grandparents, who died when he was thirteen, as well as his aunt. His grandfather was an agricultural scientist, and his grandmother was a school headmaster. Secretly a poet, Fang's grandfather introduced Fang to Chinese poetry, specifically Tang dynasty poets like Li Shangyin and Li He, as well as Chinese translations of English poetry ranging from John Keats to Lord Byron.

In middle school, Fang began writing his own poems in Chinese and studying poets like Paul Celan, Federico García Lorca, and Osip Mandelstam. Fang also cites Georg Trakl and Tomas Tranströmer as influences.

At age 17, Fang moved to the United States for college. He was turned down for English programs but had success getting into engineering programs. He ultimately attended the University of Illinois Urbana-Champaign, studying civil engineering, and met Brigit Pegeen Kelly, a poet whom he would meet with regularly to discuss his poetry.

== Career ==
Fang's poems have appeared in Narrative Magazine, Yale Review, Alta Journal, Georgia Review, and more. For The Common, Fang translated two poems by Wu Wenying, a Song dynasty poet. For his poetry, Fang has won the Joy Harjo Poetry Award and Gregory O'Donoghue International Poetry Prize.

Fang attended the Michener Center for Writers at the University of Texas at Austin. There, he learned under Roger Reeves, studied alongside writers like Rachel Heng and Tracey Rose, and also met Michael Wiegers, the editor-in-chief at Copper Canyon Press who would publish Fang's debut poetry collection, Burying the Mountain, in 2021, one year after Fang graduated from the program. He is one of the youngest poets ever published in the press.

From 2020 to 2022, Fang was a Stegner Fellow at Stanford University. Later, he joined the teaching staff at the University of Massachusetts Boston graduate creative writing program.

In The Rumpus, Fang stated that he stopped writing poetry in the Chinese language after writing so much in the English language. However, he still writes "essays, book reviews, and most frequently, social media posts" in Chinese while also reading lots of prose in Chinese.
