= Trust (novel) =

2022 novel by Hernan Diaz

- Author: Hernán Díaz
- Language: English
- Genre: Fiction
- Publisher: Riverhead Books
- Publication date: 2022
- Pages: 416
- Awards: Pulitzer Prize for Fiction

Trust is a 2022 novel written by Hernán Díaz. It was a co-recipient of the 2023 Pulitzer Prize for Fiction.

Set predominantly in New York City and focusing on the world of finance, the novel is a metafictional, fragmentary look at a secretive financier and his wife.

== Summary ==
The book is composed of four fictional texts: a novel (Bonds), an incomplete autobiography (My Life), a completed memoir (A Memoir, Remembered), and a diary (Futures). While each book focuses on many of the same characters, the information included in each is often mutually exclusive, with it being left up to the reader to determine the truth.

=== Bonds ===
Benjamin Rask is a prosperous American financier from a family of merchants-turned-financiers. In his middle age, Benjamin meets the much younger Helen, a prodigy who has spent most of her life in Europe. The two marry, and while they are not in love, they share a mutual respect. Helen begins to spend most of her money on supporting musical artists. During the Wall Street crash of 1929, the Rask fortune remains unscathed. Numerous friends believe that Rask manipulated the market and turn on the Rasks. Helen descends into madness and eczema and retires to the same Swiss sanatorium where her mentally ill father spent his last days. Impatient with her progress, Benjamin allows her to undergo convulsive therapy, which kills her.

=== My Life ===
Andrew Bevel, an American financier, begins to write his autobiography as a rebuttal to Bonds, which he claims is a thinly veiled yet slanderous account of his own life. My Life focuses on his family of financiers, citing two tenets as guiding principles: making their own conditions for success and conflating personal gain with public virtue. He credits his marriage to Mildred, an even-tempered woman, to much of his success and describes how she saved him in small ways in which she helped make his home more domestic. Mildred is eventually diagnosed with cancer and dies. Further into the text the writing becomes degraded, with editorial notes to eventually return and expand the text.

=== A Memoir, Remembered ===
Ida Partenza reveals that at 23, with her Italian anarchist-typesetter father no longer able to financially support them, she underwent a series of bizarre interviews that led her to become Andrew Bevel's ghostwriter. Bevel was infuriated by Harold Vanner's hit novel Bonds, which was clearly based on the Bevels' lives, and sought to restore his deceased wife Mildred's image.

Ida takes the job but becomes increasingly intrigued by Mildred, whom Bevel describes in demeaning terms but who was clearly an incredibly intelligent and sophisticated woman. Before the memoir is finished, Bevel dies, and Ida goes on to become a secretary and later a novelist. In her 70s, researching Mildred at Bevel's mansion, now a museum, she discovers an uncatalogued diary belonging to Mildred and steals it.

=== Futures ===
Mildred Bevel, confined to a Swiss sanatorium, details her last days before cancer takes her. In her notes, Mildred emerges as a much sharper, shrewd, and forward-looking woman than Harold Vanner's reclusive Helen or Andrew Bevel's delicate, childlike specter. Certain heretofore unshared details in Mildred's life that were replicated in Bonds, coupled with Mildred's admission she regularly corresponded with Vanner, imply that he either obtained the information directly from her or that Mildred even helped write Bonds herself.

Not merely a philanthropist, Mildred confesses how her husband initially gave her a small sum with which to play the stock market and did better than his own to the point that she could have formed her own enterprise. It is also revealed that finance was both an intellectual exercise and a source of great ambition and "a dark fuel" for Mildred, whereas Andrew was obsessed with the outcome. The two began to collaborate with Andrew filling a forward-facing role, lauded for his "intuition", while Mildred designed mathematical models and made decisions, but both grew resentful of their roles. Mildred described the mythical Bevel edge as taking advantage of the New York Stock Exchange's slow, outdated technology. In 1926, based on Mildred's off-hand remark that bribing one of four key employees on Wall Street could allow one to manipulate the market, Bevel makes the bribe and amasses an even greater fortune, leading to a rift between the two. Later, Mildred herself, seeing the coming Wall Street crash of 1929, makes a series of short investments against the US economy. Mildred's investments directly lead to the events of Black Thursday but make her and Andrew even richer than before. Ashamed of her actions, Mildred allows Andrew to take blame for her role in causing the Great Depression.

Due to Mildred's cancer, the two eventually reunite. Mildred feels peace with her impending death but notes that Andrew seems more concerned about himself.

== Writing and development ==
Diaz's initial inspiration for the novel was a desire to "write about extreme wealth and capital." Diaz sees a "certain continuity" between Trust and his first novel In the Distance.

== Reception ==
The novel won the 2022 Kirkus Prize for Fiction. The novel was longlisted for the 2022 Booker Prize. Trust was named one of the "10 Best Books of 2022" by The Washington Post and The New York Times.

The New Yorker and Esquire included the novel on their lists of the best books of 2022. The novel was also included on a year-end list of books published in 2022 which were "loved" by NPR staff. In 2024, it was ranked 50th on the New York Times list of the 100 best books of the 21st century.

The novel was named the recipient of the 2023 Pulitzer Prize for Fiction alongside Barbara Kingsolver's Demon Copperhead; this was the first time two Fiction Prizes were awarded simultaneously in the award's history.

== Adaptation ==
In 2023 it was announced that Kate Winslet would star in and produce a limited television series adaptation of Trust. Todd Haynes was reportedly set to direct the series making it his second collaboration with Winslet and HBO after Mildred Pierce.
