= Michener Center for Writers =

Masters of Fine Arts program at the University of Texas at Austin

The Michener Center for Writers is a Masters of Fine Arts program in fiction, poetry, playwriting, and screenwriting at the University of Texas at Austin. Bret Anthony Johnston is the current director of the program. Previously, James Magnuson ran the program for more than 20 years. UT Resident English Department faculty include Elizabeth McCracken, Edward Carey, Roger Reeves, and Michener Center faculty include Amy Hempel, Joanna Klink and rotating guest faculty.

The program was founded in the early 1990s through an endowment from James A. Michener and Mari Sabusawa Michener. It was originally called the Texas Center for Writers, but changed its name to honor Mr. Michener after his death in 1997.

== Fellowships ==
The MFA in Writing is a three-year, full-time residency program, unique in its dual-discipline focus. While writers apply and are admitted in a primary field — chosen from fiction, poetry, playwriting or screenwriting — they have the opportunity to develop work in a second field during their program of study. The program operates through competitive entry and offers a fellowship that includes tuition, a stipend, and other fees. Classes are taught by nationally recognized writers as visiting and adjunct faculty and by faculty in the Departments of English, Radio Television and Film, and Theatre & Dance. Fellows are eligible to submit to the Keene Prize for Literature. Winners receive $50,000 and three runners-up receive $20,000.

=== Notable alumni ===
- Rachel Heng, author of The Great Reclamation
- Kevin Powers, National Book Award Finalist for The Yellow Birds
- Maria Reva, author of Good Citizens Need Not Fear
- Fiona McFarlane, Dylan Thomas Prize winner for The High Places
- Karan Mahajan, National Book Award Finalist for The Association of Small Bombs
- Kelly Luce, Radcliffe Institute fellow, author of the novel Pull Me Under and story collection Three Scenarios in Which Hana Sasaki Grows a Tail
- Philipp Meyer, Guggenheim Fellow, Pulitzer Prize Finalist, and author of American Rust and The Son
- Domenica Ruta, author of the memoir With or Without You
- James Hannaham, author of God Says No and Delicious Foods
- Smith Henderson, author of Fourth of July Creek
- Mary Miller, author of Last Days of California
- Alix Ohlin, author of Inside and Signs & Wonders
- Roger Reeves, Poet, author of King Me
- Michael McGriff, Poet, author of Dismantling the Hills, Home Burial
- Carrie Fountain, Poet, author of Burn Lake and Instant Winner
- Bruce Snider, Poet, author of The Year We Studied Women and Paradise Indiana
- Matthew Dickman, Poet, author of Mayakovsky's Revolver and All American Poem
- Michael Dickman, Poet, author of The End of the West and Flies
- Sam Sax, Poet and novelist, winner of James Laughlin Award
- Shangyang Fang, Poet and translator
- Kirk Lynn, playwright and author of Rules for Werewolves
- Abhijat Joshi, Screenwriter
- Rivers Solomon, author of An Unkindness of Ghosts
- Donika Kelly, poet
- Ben Philippe, young adult author and screenwriter
- Ladan Osman, poet and filmmaker
- Iheoma Nwachukwu, Winner of Flannery O'Connor Award for Short Fiction for Japa and Other Stories
