= Suicide Club =

Suicide Club may refer to:

- The Suicide Club (short story collection), a 1878 short story cycle written by Robert Louis Stevenson
  - one of a number of stage, film and television adaptations of the Stevenson stories
  - The Suicide Club (2000 film), an American-Irish film adaptation of the Stevenson stories
- Suicide Club (secret society), a San Francisco-based secret society named after the Stevenson stories
- The Suicide Club (1909 film), an American silent short film directed by D. W. Griffith
- The Suicide Club (1914 film), a British silent drama film
- The Suicide Club, a 1974 made-for-television film starring Peter Haskell
- Suicide Club (film), a 2001 Japanese horror film
- Suicide Club (novel), a 2018 novel written by Rachel Heng
- The Suicide Club (novel), a 2009 novel written by Rhys Thomas
- The Suicide Club (1988 film), a film starring Lenny Henry
