= Bruce Snider =

American writer

Bruce Snider is an American poet originally from rural Indiana, who is an associate professor at the Johns Hopkins University. Previously, he taught at the University of San Francisco, Stanford University, George Washington University, the University of Texas at Austin, and Connecticut College. His poems and essays have appeared in American Poetry Review, Harvard Review, Iowa Review, New England Review, Ploughshares, Poetry, Virginia Quarterly Review, Threepenny Review, Utne Reader, Zyzzyva, and Best American Poetry 2012. With the poet Shara Lessley, Snider co-edited The Poem's Country: Place & Poetic Practice (Pleiades Press), an anthology of essays.

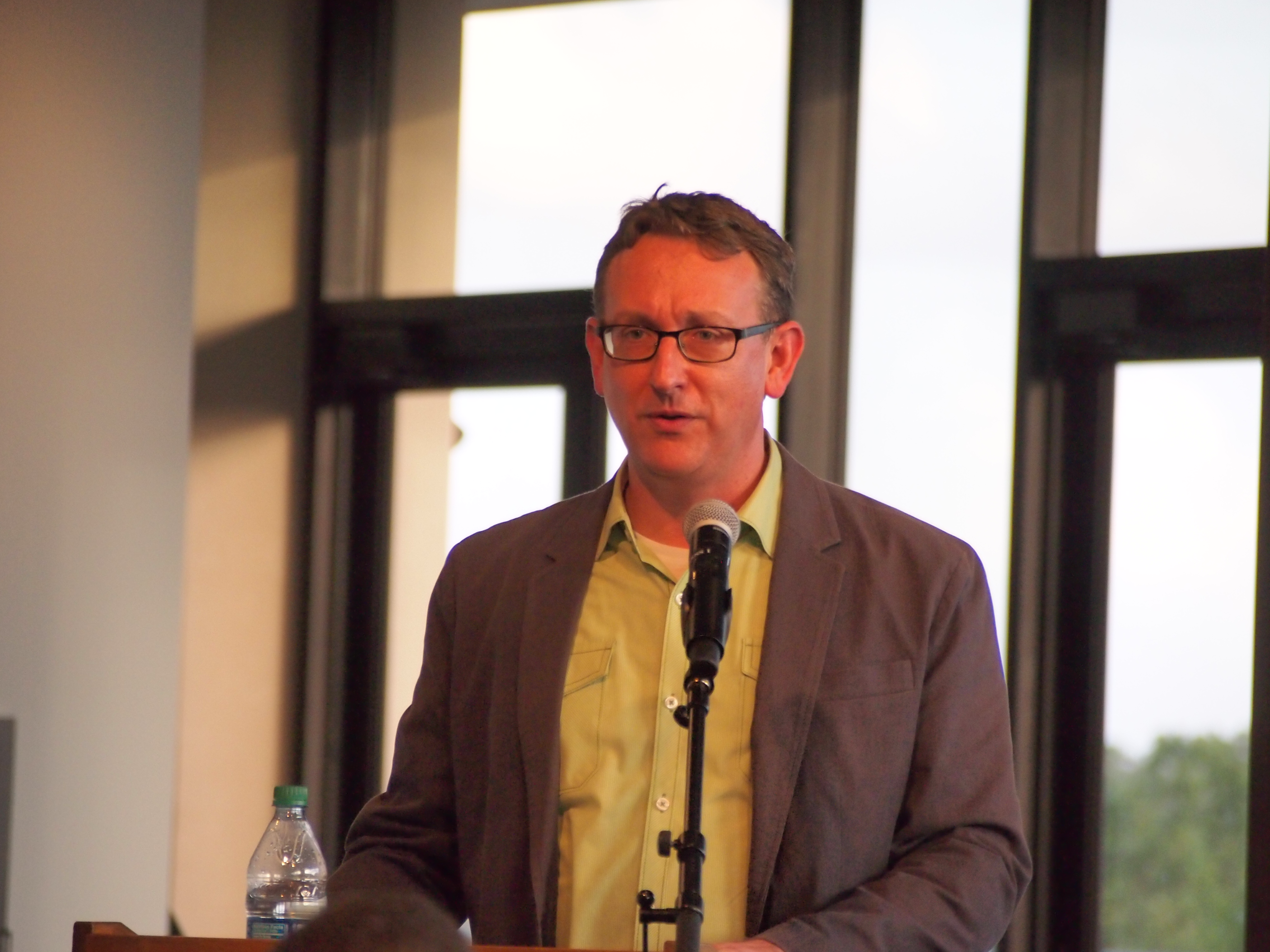
Image of Bruce Snider is an American poet

== Awards ==
- Jenny McKean Writer-in-Washington, George Washington University
- Robert Frost Fellow, Bread Loaf Writer's Conference
- Lena-Miles Wever Todd Poetry Prize, Pleaides Press
- Amy Clampitt House Residency
- James Merrill House Residency
- Wallace Stegner Fellowship, Stanford University
- Felix Pollack Prize in Poetry, University of Wisconsin Press
- James A. Michener Fellowship, University of Texas at Austin

== Bibliography ==
=== Poetry ===
Collections

- The year we studied women. Madison, Wis.: University of Wisconsin Press. 2003.
- Paradise, Indiana (Pleiades Press, 2013)
- The Poem’s Country: Place and Poetic Practice (Pleiades Press, 2018) co-editor
- Fruit (University of Wisconsin Press, 2020)

List of poems

Title	Year	First published	Reprinted/collected
Reading that Johnny Cash suffered from autonomic neuropathy when he recorded 'Hurt,'	2025	Snider, Bruce (Winter 2025). "Reading that Johnny Cash suffered from autonomic neuropathy when he recorded 'Hurt,'". 32 Poems. 44: 2–3.	
"The silence is unusually loud tonight,"	2025	Snider, Bruce (Winter 2025). "'The silence is unusually loud tonight,'". 32 Poems. 44: 1.	

== Education ==
- Master of Fine Arts University of Texas at Austin
- Bachelor of Arts Indiana University
