= Mary Miller (writer) =

American author

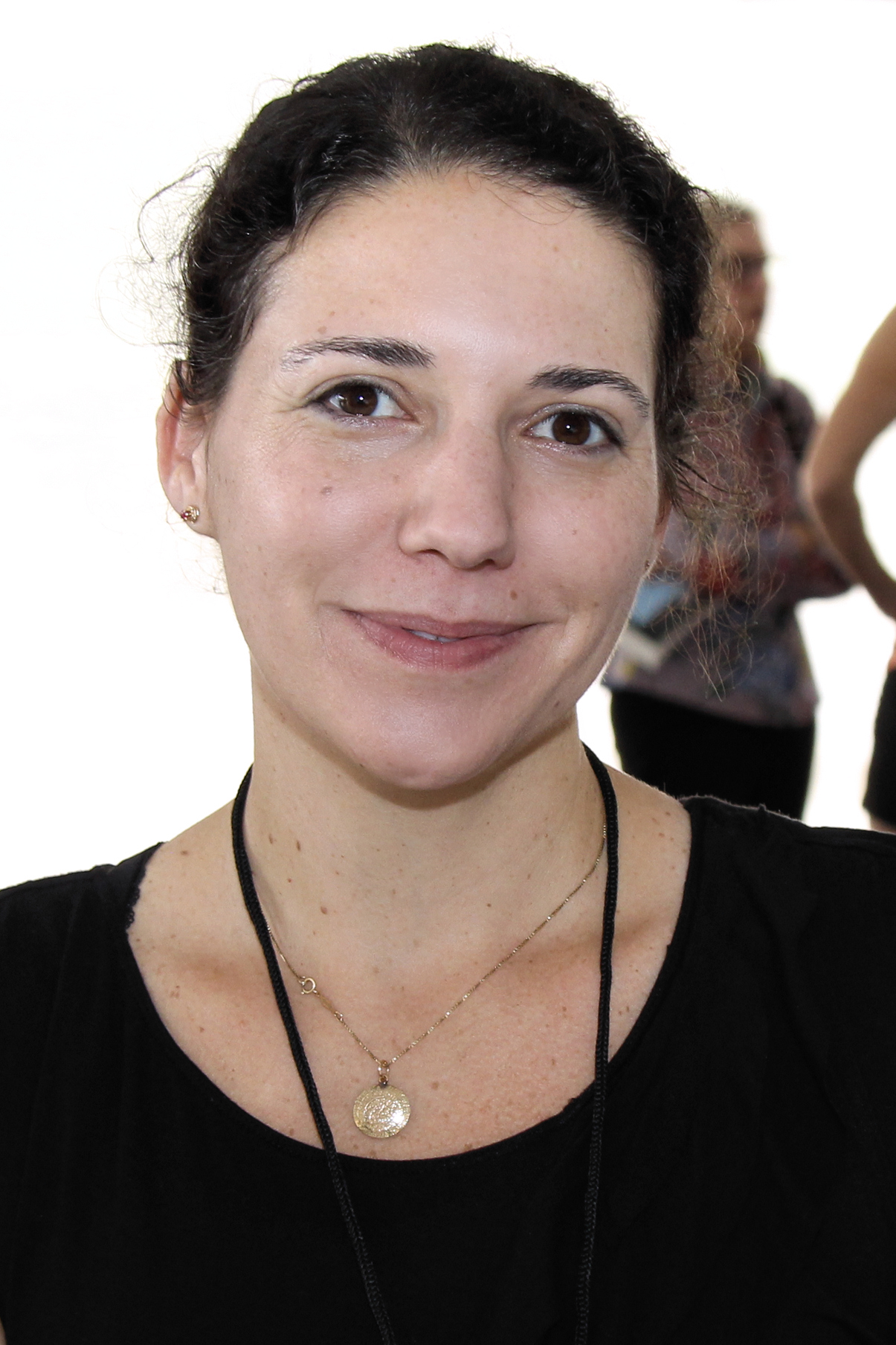
- Miller at the 2017 Texas Book Festival
- Born: Jackson, Mississippi, U.S.
- Education: University of Texas
- Occupations: Novelist, short story writer
- Writing career
- Language: English
- Genre: Coming-of-age
- Notable work: The Last Days of California
- Website: www.maryumiller.net

Mary U. Miller is an American fiction writer. She is the author of two collections of short stories entitled Big World and Always Happy Hour. Her debut novel entitled The Last Days of California was published by Liveright. It is the story of a fourteen-year-old girl on a family road trip from the South to California, led by her evangelical father. By January 2014, Big World had sold 3,000 copies and Last Days of California had an initial print run of 25,000.

Last Days of California was recommended by numerous newspapers, including the Los Angeles Times, the Milwaukee Journal Sentinel, the New York Times, and Oprah's Book Club. New York Times book critic Laurie Muchnick described her book as a "terrific first novel." Chicago Tribune critic Laura Pearson wrote that it had "vivid but unfussy prose, pitched perfectly to the attitudes and observations of a teenage girl adrift." Wall Street Journal critic Sam Sacks gave the book a mixed review, finding disappointment in that Miller's insight into characters did not extend to the subject of religious belief. Critic Josh Cook in the Star Tribune gave the book a mixed review, saying it had "plenty here" but that some scenes felt "amiss". Miller is a graduate of the Michener Center for Writers at the University of Texas. In 2014 she was the John and Renée Grisham Writer-in-Residence at Ole Miss.

== Selected works ==
- Always Happy Hour (2017)
- The Last Days of California (2014)
- Big World (2009)
