= Karan Mahajan =

American novelist

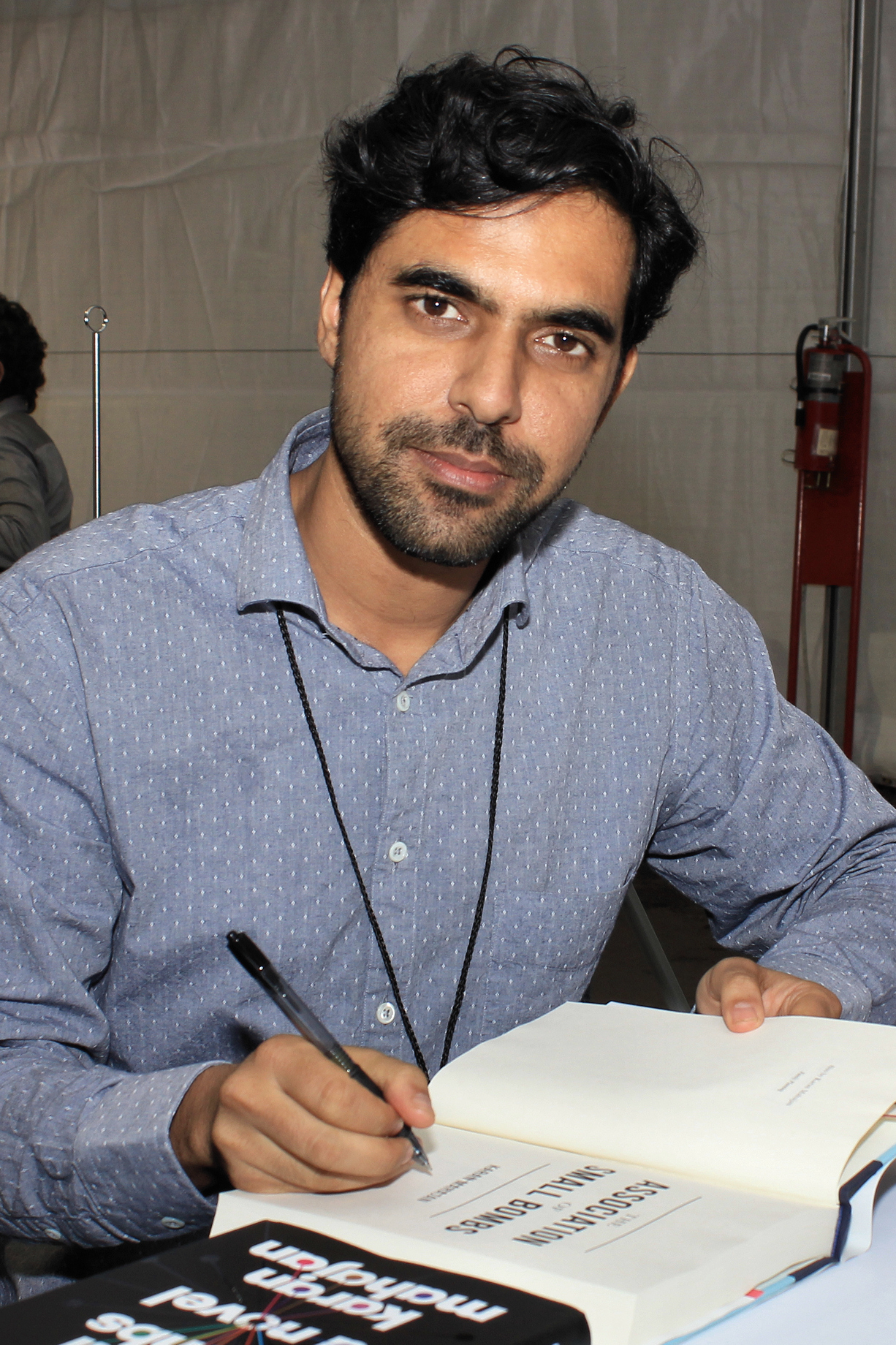
- Mahajan at the 2016 Texas Book Festival
- Born: 24 April 1984 (age 42); Stamford, Connecticut, U.S.
- Occupations: Novelist, essayist
- Writing career
- Subjects: Criticism, Fiction
- Website: www.karan-mahajan.com

Karan Mahajan (born April 24, 1984) is an Indian-American novelist, essayist, and critic. His second novel, The Association of Small Bombs, was a finalist for the 2016 National Book Award for Fiction. He has contributed writing to The Believer, The Daily Beast, the San Francisco Chronicle, Granta, and The New Yorker. In 2017, he was named one of Granta's Best Young American Novelists.

== Biography ==
Mahajan was born in Stamford, Connecticut, and grew up in New Delhi, India. He studied English and Economics at Stanford University, before receiving an MFA in fiction from the Michener Center for Writers. In addition to his writing, he has worked as an editor in San Francisco, a consultant on economic and urban planning in New York City, and a researcher in Bangalore. He currently lives in Providence, Rhode Island, and teaches at Brown University.

== Family Planning ==
Mahajan's first novel, Family Planning, was described by the San Francisco Chronicle as "Brave, breakneck, and amusing"'; in The Seattle Times as "Pleasurably crazed"; and in the Washington Post as "Genuinely funny" and "Profound". Author Suketu Mehta described it as "The truest portrait of modern New Delhi I've read, and the funniest book of the year", and novelist Jay McInerney called it "one of the best and funniest first novels I've read in years."

Family Planning was published by the Harper Perennial imprint of HarperCollins, and released in the US in 2008 and the UK in 2009, with translations forthcoming in India, Germany, Italy, Spain, France, Brazil, and Korea.

== The Association of Small Bombs ==
Mahajan's second novel, The Association of Small Bombs, about the bombing of a Delhi market, was released to widespread acclaim in 2016, with laudatory reviews appearing in The New Yorker, The New York Times Book Review, and The Washington Post. The judges of the National Book Award for Fiction described the novel as an "epic tableau drawn by the instruments of empathy, an illuminating human expedition from India to America and back, a story that burns straight through you—incandescent, absorbing, engrossing—a novel of hope and despair, love and rage, today and tomorrow." The New York Times named the novel one of its "10 Best Books of 2016."

== Bibliography ==
Novels

- Family Planning (2008)
- The Association of Small Bombs (2016), Anisfield-Wolf Book Award for Fiction, Finalist for the 2016 National Book Award in Fiction
- The Complex (2026)

Short Stories

- The True Margaret published in The New Yorker
- Practice published in Open City https://opencity.org/archive/issue-30/practice
