= The Great Reclamation =

2023 novel by Rachel Heng

- Author: Rachel Heng
- Language: English; Singlish
- Genre: Literary fiction, historical fiction, magical realism, coming-of-age novel
- Publisher: Riverhead Books
- Publication date: 28 March 2023
- Pages: 464
- ISBN: 978-0593420119
- Preceded by: Suicide Club

The Great Reclamation is a 2023 historical fiction novel by Singaporean author Rachel Heng, published by Riverhead Books. It is set against the backdrop of pre-independence Singapore, tracing the life of a young boy and his community in a rural fishing village and exploring the change in the trajectory of their lives brought on by World War II and the far-reaching transformations that accompany Singapore's transition into a modern nation-state during the mid-20th century. The book portrays Singapore as a country in flux and discusses concepts of belonging, identity and the human cost of progress.

Critically acclaimed upon release, The Great Reclamation was widely recognised for its narrative elegance and emotional resonance. Numerous publications included it among the best books of the year, praising it as blending personal storytelling and broader social commentary. The novel's description of psychological and environmental dislocation due to modernisation rendered it especially poignant, particularly in a Southeast Asian literary context where such themes remained underexplored. Its literary merit and historical insight earned it a place as a finalist for several prestigious honours, including the Andrew Carnegie Medal for Excellence in Fiction.

== Plot summary ==
=== Part 1 ===
In 1941, at seven years old, Ah Boon discovers that he can make islands appear in the Pacific Ocean. This power becomes of interest to Ah Huat, his father who previously neglected him but now takes him along fishing trips to the islands where his catches are more bountiful. Meanwhile, at school in another kampong—or fishing village—Ah Boon learns from Teacher Chia and finds himself enamored with Siok Mei, a girl whose parents are away fighting off the Japanese in mainland China. Eventually, Ah Boon and Ah Huat reveal the secret of the islands to the village elders, and the kampong prospers because the area is teeming with fish and marine life. By 1942, however, the Japanese invade Singapore, and the Ang Mohs—the British rulers of Singapore—surrender. One morning, Ah Huat is captured and killed.

=== Part 2 ===
Years later, in 1945, the Japanese surrender, bringing the Ang Mohs back into power in Singapore. More years pass, and Ah Boon and Siok Mei are teenagers who frequently protest Ang Moh rule. In middle school, they and their classmates, Eng Soon, Geok Tin, and Ah Mui, learn revolutionary ideology. Eventually, Ah Boon grows certain of his love for Siok Mei and confesses to her at a protest, but she turns him down. They then become awkward together for some time at school. One afternoon, Siok Mei tells Ah Boon that they can never be together.

=== Part 3 ===
More years pass. Ah Boon is 27 now. Slowly, the Gah Men—an Asian intellectual, technocratic class—amass power in Singapore and plan to oust the Ang Mohs. Meanwhile, Siok Mei and Eng Soon have married and expect a child. In Ah Boon's kampong, the Gah Men have established a Community Centre. There, Ah Boon gets a job and works under a Gah Woman named Natalie. This decision polarises Ah Boon's family, as his mother and brother hesitantly welcome Singapore's changes while Uncle remains skeptical of the Gah Men's plans for Singapore. At the Community Centre, Ah Boon helps tidy the building while rallying the kampong's residents to attend its events and use its facilities. One day, Siok Mei comes to the Community Centre to ask for Ah Boon's support for the leftist cause—against the will of the Gah Men—but he rejects her, stating firmly that he works with the Gah Men now.

Behind closed doors, the Gah Men plan the land reclamation projects to physically expand Singapore's coast and build countless apartment buildings afterward, which threatens the kampongs. Reluctantly, Ah Boon helps rally support from his kampong, and 85% of villagers agree to move into apartments. As a result, he is promoted to a Gah Man.

=== Part 4 ===
Ah Boon and Natalie get closer. When the Gah Men ask for a report on fishing communities across Singapore, Ah Boon volunteers to interview his own community. One night, Ah Boon invites Natalie out to the seashore and, on his family's boat, brings her to the island which only he can see. When Ah Boon and Natalie announce their marriage, his mother and brother are happy, but his Uncle lashes out. Soon, most of the kampong's residents—Ah Boon and Natalie, Ah Boon's family, and others—finally move into their apartments, but Uncle stays in the now-deserted kampong.

=== Part 5 ===
The land reclamation project comes to a halt due to resource constraints: there is not enough sand. Meanwhile, Eng Soon is captured, and Siok Mei, now hunted by the Ang Mohs for her dedication to the leftist cause, is hidden on Ah Boon's island in the Pacific Ocean. In his office, Ah Boon is asked if he can help with the land reclamation project by locating the islands that Natalie attempted to find on behalf of the Gah Men. Realizing that Siok Mei is trying to trick him with love in order to free herself and Eng Soon, Ah Boon ultimately sells her out and reveals the locations of the islands to the Gah Men.

Afterward, Singapore becomes independent, joining the Federation of Malaya, which officially ends British rule over the country. Ah Boon and Natalie now have a child, and several of Ah Boon's islands have been mined down to nothing in order for the land reclamation project to proceed. He ascends the ranks of the Gah Men and never sees Siok Mei ever again. Eagerly, he awaits for Singapore's continued progress into the future.

== Characters ==
- Ah Boon: A boy who can see islands. Previously neglected by his father, his power to see islands becomes a way for them to bond, and it provides him with a source of confidence as he assumes a mystical role in the kampong's economic prosperity through fishing. In his youth, he takes a liking to Siok Mei but finds himself uncertain about her pursuit in revolutionary ideology. As an adult, he begins working for the Gah Men and, at times, struggles to come to terms with Singapore's future.
- Ah Huat: Ah Boon's father. When he was young, his father drowned, leaving him to grow up with his mother and sisters; later, he was taught how to fish by his sister's husband. After the Japanese take over Singapore, he and his brother leave their kampong to register themselves with the newly established colonial government, which leads to his death.
- Ah Bee: Ah Boon's mother. After her husband's death, she and Uncle take care of things together at the kampong. She remains cautious of Ah Boon's participation in political activities with Siok Mei and constantly tries to dissuade him from joining her in them. When Ah Boon joins the Gah Men, she is hesitant but ultimately believes in his vision for Singapore's progress.
- Hia: Ah Boon's older brother. At first, he remains the favorite child of Ah Huat, but this changes after Ah Boon discovers the islands. From then on, Hia lives a traditional life in the kampong while his brother is off getting educated: he fishes, works in a market, and settles down with a wife very quickly.
- Uncle: Ah Boon's uncle and Ah Huat's brother. Full of guilt for the death of Ah Huat, he tries to maintain the economic prosperity and honor of the kampong as a fisherman. When the Gah Men assume power in Singapore, he holds true to his skepticism of authority and ultimately opposes Ah Boon's attempts to relocate the kampong into apartment-style living.
- Siok Mei: A girl whose parents left to fight the Japanese in mainland China. From a young age, she is certain about the leftist cause and works hard to be a proletarian intellectual. When Ah Boon falls in love with her, she struggles to reconcile her desire for political change in Singapore with that of her own personal wants. Later, she marries Eng Soon, a fellow radical, and has a child, Yang, with him.
- Teacher Chia: A teacher who was once dismissed from a teaching post in the city by the Ang Mohs. Later, during the Japanese occupation of Singapore, he goes into hiding on one of Ah Boon's islands due to his left-leaning sympathies. After Japan's surrender, he continues leftist organizing and even participates in armed insurrection in his old age.
- Natalie: A regional manager for the Community Centers all across Singapore's kampongs. Having had a difficult upbringing, she vests all of her efforts as an adult into the industrialization and modernization of Singapore through the Community Centers. Realizing this shared value in Ah Boon, she later goes on to marry him.
- Eng Soon: One of Ah Boon and Siok Mei's classmates in middle school. He develops a crush on Siok Mei, who rejects him at first but, after several years of protesting together, decides to marry him and bear his child.

== Title ==
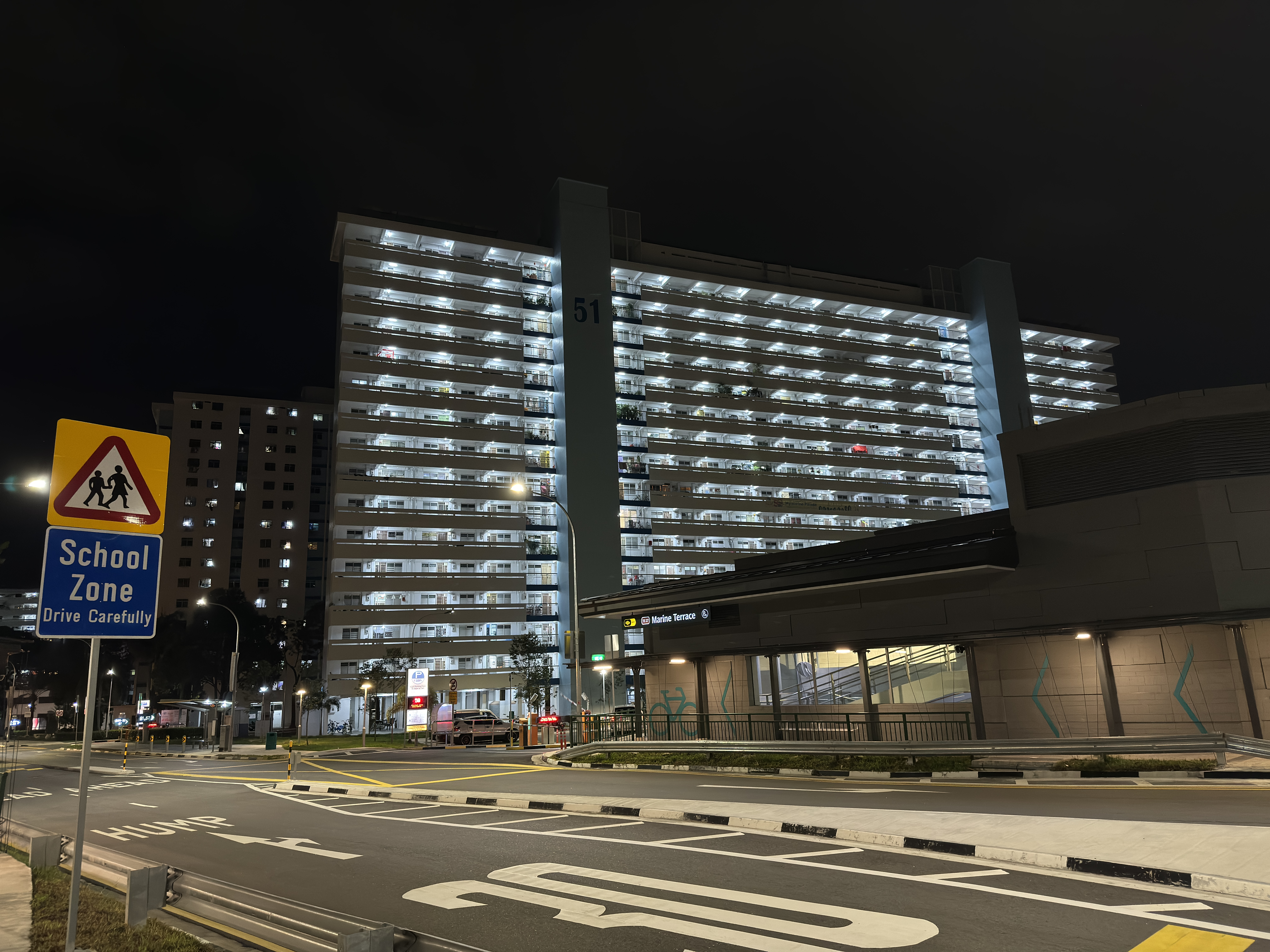
Marine Parade, an estate in Singapore built on reclaimed land during the late 20th century

The Great Reclamation refers to the land reclamation projects, or the East Coast Reclamation Scheme, which was a physical expansion effort led by the Government of Singapore after independence that ultimately added 1,525 hectares (3,770 acres) to the country's southeastern coastline. It began in 1966 and took two decades, in seven phases, to complete in 1985, costing $613 million in total. The land is now occupied by locales such as Marine Parade, Katong, East Coast Park, and others. Rachel Heng, herself, had attended a school that was built on reclaimed land.

Heng ultimately chose the title in order to associate the strong wills and challenges of her characters with that of a nation building itself. In Shondaland, she stated that "People tried to dissuade me from titling it because maybe they thought it was too abstract, but it was important to me because it really speaks to the central question of the book".

== Background ==
=== Writing ===
Heng grew up after Singapore's development and, through fragmented stories told by her family members, learned of its preceding history. In BOMB Magazine, she stated, "When I was growing up, Singapore's development was always positioned as a miracle story ... But that story never acknowledges the loss and the sadness, and the brutality of change, the break with what came before." She talked about Singapore changed physically at a rapid pace, such that entire neighborhoods and towns could become completely different in the span of a few years. As a result, Heng felt a "strange temporal dislocation" being wedged between her aunts' stories of poverty and her own upbringing in relative prosperity. She thus wanted to write a book "about how Singapore became Singapore."

Heng began researching for The Great Reclamation in 2017, spending an entire year reading books, speaking with scholars, interviewing her family, and perusing through archives like the National Archives of Singapore. Specifically, she learned about Singapore's environmental history from Timothy Barnard, an associate professor in history at the National University of Singapore; discussed colonial-era fishing industry data with Ruizhi Choo from the University of Hawaiʻi at Mānoa; and studied Singapore's coastal developments with help from Dan Riess, a coastline scientist. At the time, Heng was a student at the Michener Center for Writers and worked on parts of her novel with her thesis advisor, Elizabeth McCracken. In 2018, an excerpt titled "Gah Men" was published in Guernica. Heng finished her first draft the same year and finished revising it in 2021.

Heng has stated that Ah Boon first originated as a protagonist for an earlier short story which would later become The Great Reclamation's third part. By making him the protagonist for the novel later on, Heng had wanted to write a character that was growing, changing, and resolving his own identity against the backdrop of a country doing the same. Specifically, she intended for Ah Boon to be a character who was uncertain between his vision for the future and always oscillating between different possibilities. With Ah Boon additionally juxtaposed with the other characters in the novel, such as Siok Mei, Uncle, Hia, and others who possess "different visions", Heng wanted a story of "a community and a country" that was "polyphonic and big and to have all these competing visions and voices".

Originally, The Great Reclamation was intended to end in the present-day of Singapore, but Heng reached 130 thousand words and felt that it was a "natural ending point" to conclude the novel earlier on the day Singapore merged with the Federation of Malaya. Additionally, many prospective agents expressed concerns about the book's length, and her actual agent found it wise to expand the existing story and characters rather than prolonging the novel's timeline.

=== Influences ===
In Shondaland and NPR, Heng named The Red and the Black by Stendhal—a novel about a French man who idolises and wants to be like Napoleon—as an inspiration for the character of Ah Boon and the novel's trajectory as a whole. Other inspirations were The Known World by Edward P. Jones, The Man with the Compound Eyes by Wu Ming-yi, State of Emergency by Jeremy Tiang, The Old Drift by Namwali Serpell, In the Skin of a Lion by Michael Ondaatje, and The Ten Thousand Things by Maria Dermoût. Charles Lim's SEA STATE, as well as photographs by Sim Chi Yin, were additionally named as inspirational.

In The Great Reclamation's acknowledgements, Heng cited several books for her research on Singaporean history including but not limited to Singapore: A Biography by Mark R. Frost and Yu-Mei Balasingamchow, Lee's Lieutenants: Singapore's Old Guard by Lam Peng Er and Kevin YL Tan, The Politics of Landscapes in Singapore by Brenda S. A. Yeoh and Lily Kong, and other books by Chye Kiang Heng, Teo Soh Lung, Gungwu Wang, and Neo Kim Seng. She also extensively studied the Siglap Community Centre Youth Group's publication, A Report on the Fishermen of Siglap.

== Critical reception ==
In a starred review, Kirkus Reviews pointed out the rich, well-researched backdrop of the novel but lauded Heng's decision to minimise context and instead focus primarily on her cast of characters as they proceeded through the motions of Singapore's changing landscape. In particular, the reviewer commended Heng's writing of Ah Boon, calling his development "absolutely brilliant and deserves wide notice." Also in a starred review, Publishers Weekly stated that Ah Boon's story was greatly emotional and that, through him, Heng "articulates the individual sacrifices and the inevitable divides that arise in nation building, skillfully capturing the inner psyche of a Singaporean everyman caught between two immovable worlds."

=== In Asia ===
Olivia Ho, writing for The Straits Times, said "It might be the next great Singapore novel." Ho specifically saw the novel as a mostly historical realist one in the tradition of Suchen Christine Lim, Meira Chand, and Jeremy Tiang but appreciated how Heng's subtle usage of magical realism interfaced with the real-life history of Singapore. Toward the end of her review, Ho appreciated that Heng's writing was multifaceted in perspective: "The novel does not villainise the project of nation-building outright. There is nuance and reason in her portraits of the Gah Men and their goals of progress, particularly Natalie, who is sincerely devoted to improving the lives of lower-income groups."

Similarly, the Singaporean writer Jeremy Tiang, for the Los Angeles Review of Books, saw much to appreciate in Heng's decision to infuse Singapore's history with magical realism. He wrote that the existence of Ah Boon's hidden islands "dramatically" rose the stakes of the land reclamation projects by posing the question of whether Singapore's government would've destroyed entire islands, tinged with the magic miracles, all for the sake of their goal. In the conclusion to his review, Tiang ultimately saw the book as a statement on the cost-benefit analysis of progress, what was or wasn't worth casting aside and sacrifice in the interest of forging one's future.

Thu-huong Ha, writing in The Japan Times, discussed Heng's decision to focus more on the personal aspects of her characters rather than fully describing the political context within which they lived, stating that "This lack of explication could frustrate some, but it's actually a strength of the novel: It's not meant to hold readers' hands or be an introductory course in Singaporean history and culture." Ha also appreciated the subtlety of Heng's use of local language—such as "Jipunlang" rather than "Japanese" or "Gah Men" for bureaucrats—and additionally stated that the book would be appropriate for a screen adaptation, as "The plot and pacing are cinematic ... with a full cast of fleshed-out characters". Similarly, The Asian Review of Books noted "Heng's writing is engaging from the beginning and it doesn't take long for the story to pick up speed."

=== In the United States ===
Jenny Tinghui Zhang, writing for The New York Times, called the book a "triumph" in how it took on the history of Singapore without letting "history overpower the narrative" as in the case of other novels of historical fiction. Instead, Zhang argued that the book was "epic" not merely for its ambition to tackle Singapore's history but also because of how it tackled "the big things, like love and identity and loss" in addition to "the little things, too, from the buttery taste of steamed fish to the smooth surface of a rubber seed." Zhang concluded "it is a pleasure to simply live alongside these characters ... we are being carried to a larger purpose, one that will ask us to change, to sacrifice, and yes, to want to be great."

In Electric Literature, Marisa Siegel observed how Heng wrote and positioned Ah Boon to be a protagonist whose existence and experiences interrogated "the interwoven legacies of war, colonialism, and nationalism have shaped her homeland." Siegel also commended Heng's, prose, stating that "Lush and evocative, Heng's sentences render every setting and each scene with vivid intensity", and said the book's length was an asset, not a hindrance, to Heng's world-building. Similarly, The New Yorker, in a briefly noted review, wrote that the novel "illustrates the unsteadiness of both the physical environment and personal and political allegiances during a time of overwhelming historical change."

== Accolades and mentions ==
The book appeared on several year-end lists. Electric Literature, The New Yorker, BookPage, and Town & Country called it a best book of 2023. Time included it on their list of 100 must-reads for 2023, and Amazon Books considered it a runner-up in their best books list in June 2023. Additionally, The Great Reclamation was longlisted for the Andrew Carnegie Medal for Excellence in Fiction, the Joyce Carol Oates Prize, and the Dublin Literary Award.

The novel was also a frequent selection for seasonal and topical recommendations. Penguin Random House and PureWow recommended it for 2023 Asian American and Pacific Islander Heritage Month, while The New York Times picked it as an Editor's Choice on 4 May 2023. It was further highlighted as a top read by Vanity Fair, Harper's Bazaar, Orion, USA Today, and PopSugar, with Ms. describing it as a book to "absolutely read." Recognition continued into 2024 with the paperback's release, earning a place on the American Booksellers Association spring reading guide and a further recommendation from The New York Times.
