= Carrie Fountain =

American poet

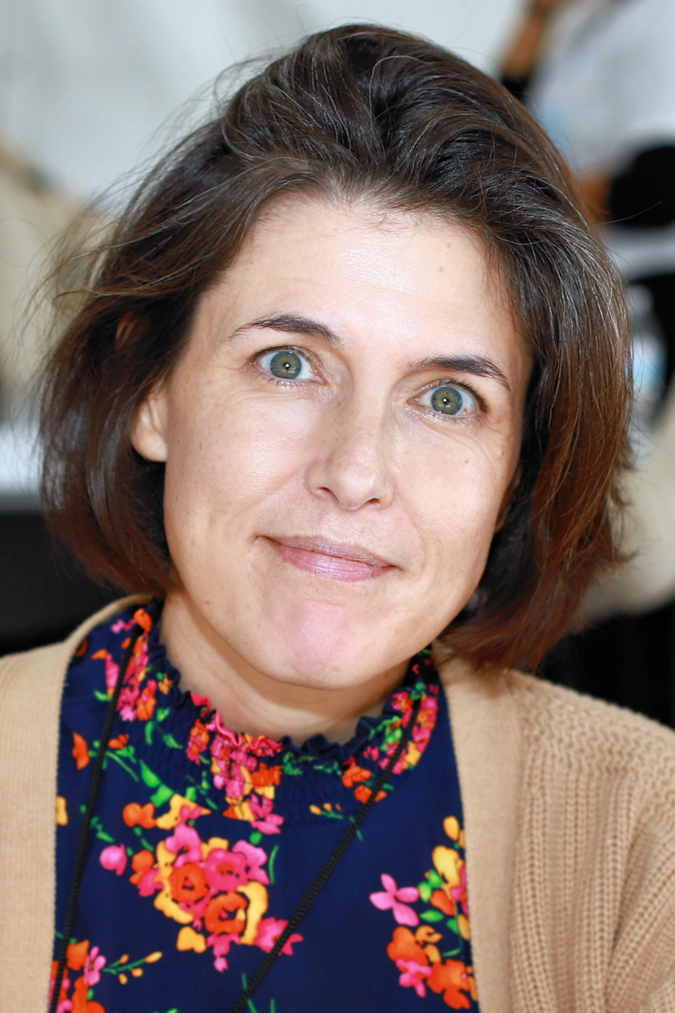
- Fountain at the 2022 Texas Book Festival.
- Education: New Mexico State University (BA); University of Texas at Austin (MFA)
- Occupations: Poet, novelist

Carrie Fountain is an American poet and writer of young adult fiction. She served as 2019 Poet Laureate of Texas.

She is from Las Cruces, New Mexico. She was a fellow at the Michener Center for Writers, and received Swink Magazine's Award for Emerging Writers and the Marlboro Poetry Prize. She wrote for The Texas Observer, and was poetry columnist for the Austin American-Statesman.

Her work has appeared in Cimarron Review, Black Warrior Review, 32 Poems, and Missouri Review Online. She lives in Austin, Texas and teaches at St. Edward's University.

She was named the 2019 Poet Laureate of Texas.

== Awards ==
- 2009 National Poetry Series, for Burn Lake

== Works ==
- "Purple Heart", Marlboro Review
- "Burn Lake 2", Swink, 2007
- "Father and Son at the Mesilla Valley Drive-thru Bank", AGNI
- "Theory of Perfection", AGNI
- "El Camino Real 3 ", Poetry for Children
- "Will You"
- Burn Lake. Penguin Group USA, 2010, ISBN 978-0-14-311771-1
- Instant Winner: Poems. Penguin Group USA, 2014, ISBN 978-0143126638
- I'm Not Missing: A Novel. Flatiron Books, New York, 2018, ISBN 978-1250132512
