= Domenica Ruta =

American author

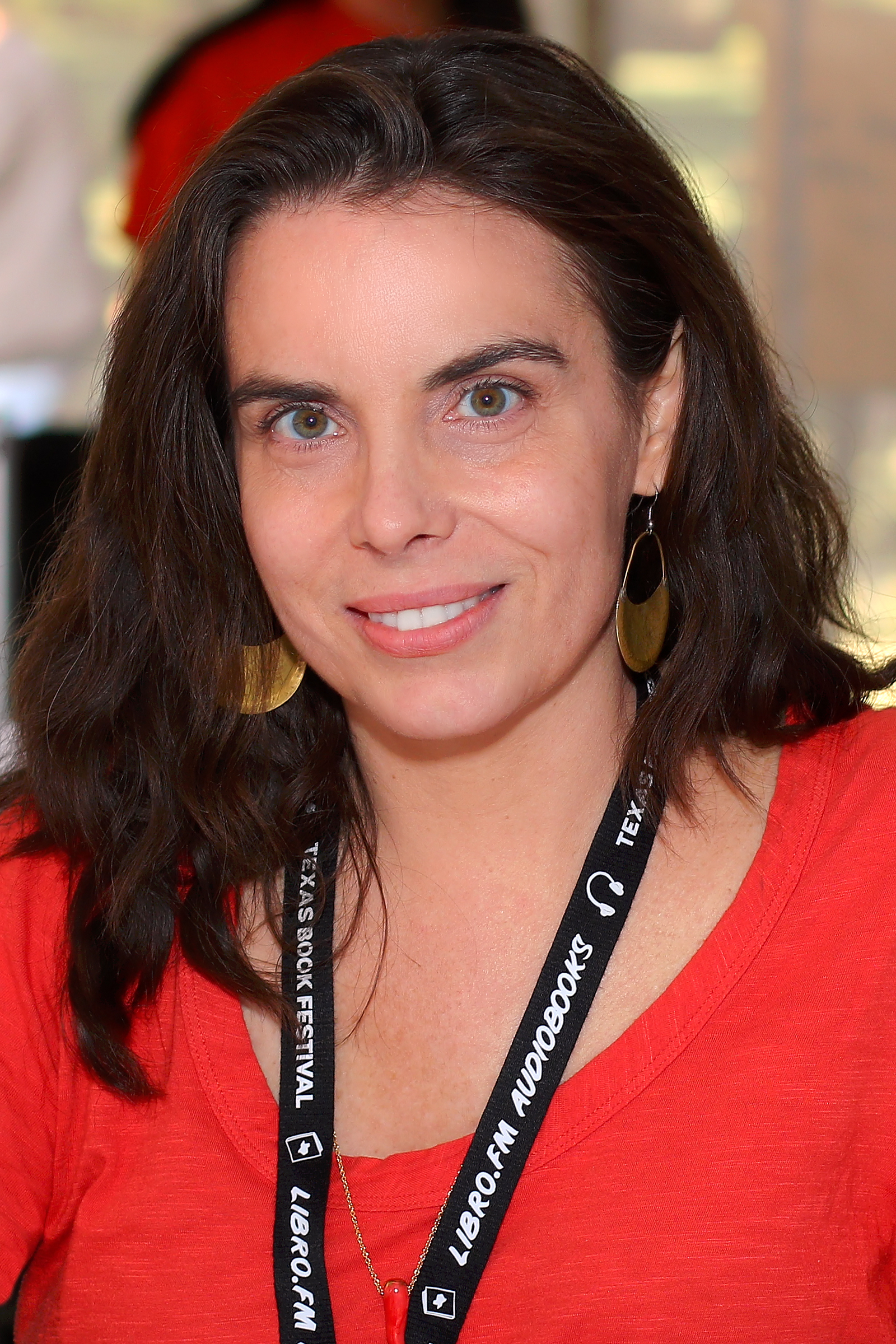
- Ruta at the 2025 Texas Book Festival
- Born: Danvers, Massachusetts
- Education: Phillips Academy; Oberlin College; University of Texas at Austin
- Occupation: Writer
- Writing career
- Genre: Memoir
- Subjects: Addiction, family relationships
- Notable work: With or Without You
- Website: www.domenicaruta.com

Domenica Ruta is an American author. Her first book, the memoir With or Without You, was a New York Times Best Seller.

== Early life ==
Ruta was born in Danvers, Massachusetts to unwed teenage parents. She attended Phillips Academy and Oberlin College. Ruta holds a Master of Fine Arts from the Michener Center for Writers at the University of Texas at Austin.

== Career ==
Ruta's memoir, With or Without You, was published on February 26, 2013. It chronicles Ruta's difficult relationship with her drug-addicted mother, as well as Ruta's own struggle with alcoholism. Her debut novel, Last Day, was named one of The New York Times 100 Notable books of 2019. Her most recent novel, All the Mothers, was published on May 6, 2025 by Random House.

She currently teaches memoir writing and creative nonfiction for Gotham Writers Workshop in New York City.
