= Joanna Klink =

American poet

- Klink at the 2026 Texas Book Festival
- Born: Iowa City, Iowa
- Education: Iowa Writers' Workshop (M.F.A.); Johns Hopkins University (Ph.D.)
- Occupation: Poet

Joanna Klink is an American poet born in Iowa City, Iowa. She received an M.F.A. in Poetry from the Iowa Writers' Workshop and a Ph.D. in Humanities from Johns Hopkins University, and was the Briggs-Copeland Poet at Harvard University and for many years taught in the Creative Writing Program at The University of Montana. She currently teaches at UT Austin's Michener Center for Writers. Her most recent book, Days & Chances, was published September 15, 2026 by Penguin.

== Publications ==
- They Are Sleeping (University of Georgia Press, 2000)
- Circadian (Penguin Books, 2007)
- Raptus (Penguin Books, 2010)
- Excerpts from a Secret Prophecy (Penguin Books, 2015)
- The Nightfields (Penguin Books, 2020)
- Days & Chances (Penguin Books, 2026)

== Honors and awards ==
- Rona Jaffe Foundation Writers' Award (2003)
- Briggs-Copeland Poet, Harvard University (2008-2011)
- Jeannette Haien Ballard Writer's Award (2012)
- Civitella Ranieri (2012, 2017)
- American Academy of Arts and Letters (2013)
- Amy Lowell Poetry Traveling Scholarship (2018)
- The Bogliasco Foundation (2018)
- John Simon Guggenheim Fellowship (2019)
