= Suicide Club (novel) =

Novel by Rachel Heng

- First edition (UK)
- Author: Rachel Heng
- Language: English
- Published: 2018
- Publisher: Sceptre (UK); Henry Holt and Co. (US)
- Media type: Print
- Pages: 372
- ISBN: 9781473672901

Suicide Club is the 2018 debut novel of Rachel Heng.
