= Matthew Dickman =

American poet (born 1975)

- Born: August 20, 1975 (age 51); Portland, Oregon, U.S.
- Education: Portland Community College; University of Oregon (BA); University of Texas at Austin
- Occupation: Poet
- Parent(s): Allen Hull; Wendy Dickman
- Relatives: Michael Dickman (brother)
- Writing career
- Notable awards: Kate Tufts Discovery Award (2009)

Matthew Dickman (born August 20, 1975) is an American poet. He and his identical twin brother, Michael Dickman, also a poet, were born in Portland, Oregon.

== Life ==
The Dickman twins (Matthew is the younger and slightly taller) were raised in the Lents neighborhood of Portland, which declined into a dangerous neighborhood after a highway was built through it in 1975. Their mother, Wendy Dickman, raised them alone; her stepfather was the father of poet Sharon Olds. They have a younger half-sister and an older half-brother and half-sister through their father, Allen Hull. After starting at the elementary school across the street, the boys attended private schools. Matthew Dickman went to Portland Community College and then graduated with a B.A. from the University of Oregon in 2001; the brothers then studied creative writing together at the University of Texas at Austin. The twins had a brief stint as actors, featuring in the 2002 Steven Spielberg film Minority Report as the precognitive twins. After graduate school Matthew Dickman lived in Hudson, New York, but by 2009 both had returned to Portland, where he worked at Whole Foods; both brothers supported themselves with food-service jobs since a joint apprenticeship to a butcher at age thirteen.

== Career ==
Matthew Dickman has received fellowships from The Michener Center for Writers at the University of Texas at Austin, The Vermont Studio Center, and The Fine Arts Work Center in Provincetown. He is the author of three chapbooks, Amigos, Something about a Black Scarf and Wish You Were Here, and three full-length poetry collections. His first book, All-American Poem, was winner of the 2008 American Poetry Review/Honickman First Book Prize in Poetry, published by American Poetry Review and distributed by Copper Canyon Press. He was also the winner of the 2009 Kate Tufts Discovery Award for that book, and the inaugural May Sarton Award from the American Academy of Arts & Sciences. His second full collection of poetry, Mayakovsky's Revolver, was published by W. W. Norton and Company in 2012. He is also the coauthor with his brother, of the 2012 poetry collection 50 American Plays, also published by Copper Canyon Press, and the 2016 Brother, a collection of poems on their half-brother's suicide. His third collection, Wonderland, was published in 2018 by Norton.

His work has appeared in The American Poetry Review, Tin House, Clackamas Literary Review, AGNI Online, The Missouri Review, and The New Yorker.

Dickman works in advertising where he is a freelance senior copy writer and creative director. He has been a Visiting Writer at Reed College, and is an adjunct fellow at The Attic institute in Portland.

== Awards ==
- 2006 Provincetown Fine Arts Work Center Fellowship
- 2008 Oregon Literary Fellowships recipient
- 2008 American Poetry Review/Honickman First Book Prize in Poetry.
- 2009 Kate Tufts Discovery Award
- 2009 Oregon Book Award finalist

== Bibliography ==
=== Chapbooks ===
- Dickman, Matthew (2007). Amigos. Q Ave Press.
- — (2008). Something about a black scarf. Azul Press.
- — (2013). Wish you were here. Spork Press.
- — (2014). 24 Hours. Onestar Press/Poor Claudia.

=== Collections ===
- Dickman, Matthew (2008). All-American poem. American Poetry Review.
- — (2012). Mayakovsky's revolver. W. W. Norton.
- Dickman, Matthew & Michael Dickman (2012). 50 American plays : poems. Port Townsend, Wash.: Copper Canyon Press.
- Dickman, Matthew (2018). Wonderland : poems. W.W. Norton.
- Dickman, Matthew (2022). Husbandry : poems. W.W. Norton.
