= Patricia Engel =

Colombian-American writer

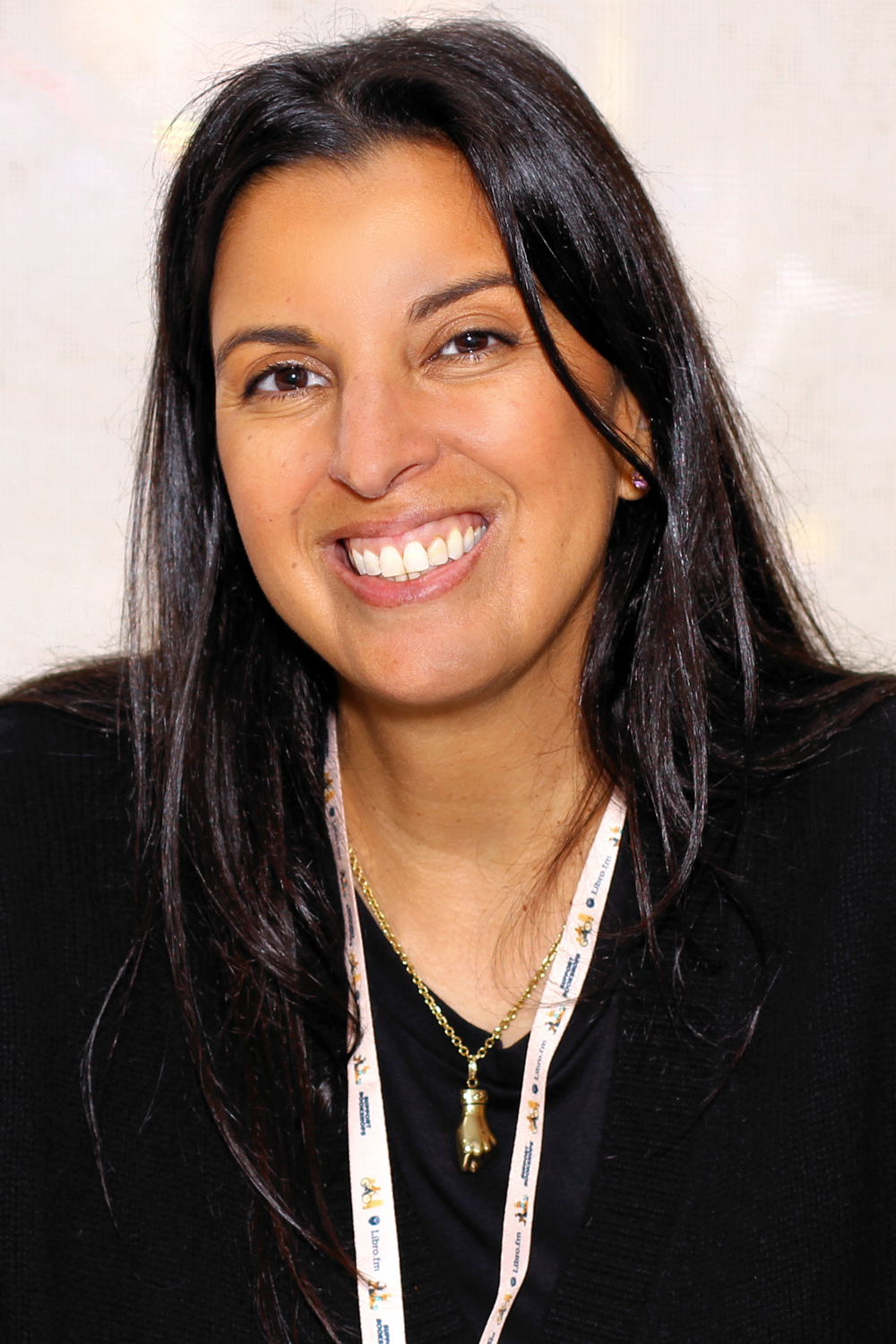
- Engel at the 2023 Texas Book Festival
- Occupations: Author, professor, editor
- Writing career
- Notable works: It's Not Love, It's Just Paris; Vida; The Veins of the Ocean
- Website: patriciaengel.com

Patricia Engel is a Colombian-American writer, professor of creative writing at the University of Miami, and author of five books, including Vida, which was a PEN/Hemingway Fiction Award Finalist and winner of the Premio Biblioteca de Narrativa Colombiana, Colombia's national prize in literature. She was the first woman, and Vida the first book in translation, to receive the prize.

She is also the author of It's Not Love, It's Just Paris, and the novel The Veins of the Ocean, which won the 2017 Dayton Literary Peace Prize. The San Francisco Chronicle called Engel "a unique and necessary voice for the Americas."

== Early life and education ==
Engel was born to Colombian parents who immigrated to the United States. She was raised in New Jersey and attended public schools. She earned a bachelor's degree in French and Art History from New York University in 1999 and a Master of Fine Arts degree in fiction from Florida International University in 2007.

She has studied in Paris and has taught creative writing at the University of Miami and elsewhere.

== Career ==
Engel's work has appeared in The Sun, A Public Space, Harvard Review, and Kenyon Review, among many others, and has been anthologized in The Best American Short Stories 2017, The Best American Mystery Stories 2014, and more. She was awarded the Boston Review Fiction Prize in 2008 for her story "Desaliento," and was the recipient of a fellowship in literature from the National Endowment for the Arts in 2014.

She frequently writes about immigration, biculturalism, and transnationalism in both English and Spanish.

Her first book, Vida, was a finalist for the 2011 Hemingway Foundation/PEN Award and the 2011 New York Public Library Young Lions Fiction Award. In 2017, Vida received the Premio Biblioteca de Narrativa Colombiana, Colombia's national prize in literature. Vida was named a New York Times Notable Book of 2010. It also won a Florida Book Award and an Independent Publisher Book Award, and was named an NPR "Best Debut of the Year."

Engel's debut novel, It's Not Love, It's Just Paris, received the International Latino Book Award in 2014 and was praised by Edwidge Danticat, who said the novel contained one of her favorite passages in literature. The love story, set in Paris at the turn of the millennium, was also praised by Roxane Gay, writing for The Nation, who called it "an absorbing debut novel."

Her novel The Veins of the Ocean was awarded the 2017 Dayton Literary Peace Prize and named a New York Times Editors' Choice and a San Francisco Chronicle Best Book of the Year. The novel follows Reina, a woman in her late twenties who is trying to come to terms with the sadness and guilt she feels after her brother Carlito's incarceration. He is sentenced to death in Florida for throwing his girlfriend's daughter, Shayna, off a bridge.

Engel's fourth book, Infinite Country, was an instant New York Times bestseller and a Reese's Book Club pick in 2021. Infinite Country won the 2021 New American Voices award and was long listed for the 2022 Carnegie Medal for Excellence in Fiction and the 2022 Dublin Literary Award. In 2021, Infinite Country was also listed as a Big Read by the National Endowment for the Arts.

In 2023, her fifth book, a story collection titled The Faraway World, was published. That year it was named a Notable Book of the Year by The Washington Post, a Best Book of the Year by the Boston Globe, and was longlisted for The Story Prize. The Faraway World was also named a 2023 New York Times Editors' choice.

Engel's short story, "Libélula" from The Faraway World, was published in Oprah Daily.

Engel is a literary editor of the Miami Rail, a quarterly publication providing critical coverage of arts, politics and culture. In 2019, she was awarded a Guggenheim Fellowship in Fiction and an O. Henry Award for her story "Aguacero".

In 2023, Engel won the John Dos Passos Prize for Literature, "a literary award given annually by Longwood University to a talented American writer who experiments with form, explores a range of voices and merits further recognition."

== Personal life ==
Engel now resides in Miami and New York.

== Bibliography ==
=== Books ===
- 2010 Vida

Translated to Spanish by Alfaguara, 2016

- 2013 It's Not Love, It's just Paris

Translated to Spanish as No es amor, es solo París by Grijalbo, 2014

- 2016 The Veins of the Ocean

Translated to French as Les veines de l'océan by Flammarion, 2016
Translated to Spanish as Las venas del océano by Alfaguara, 2017

- 2021 Infinite Country
- 2023 The Faraway World

=== Short stories ===
- 2019 "Mauro and Elena" in Ploughshares
- 2018 "Aguacero", Kenyon Review May/June
- 2018 "The Book of Saints", The Sun March
- 2016 "Campoamor", Chicago Quarterly Review
- 2015 "Ramiro", Zzzyva
- 2013 "Aida", Harvard Review
- 2011 "Fausto", A Public Space
- 2010 "The Bridge", The Atlantic Fiction For Kindle
- 2009 "Día", Guernica
- 2007 "Lucho", Boston Review

=== Essays and criticism ===
- "La intimidad de la distancia," Arcadia

== Awards and achievements ==
- Winner of the John Dos Pasos Prize for Literature 2023
- Winner of the New American Voices Award by the Institute for Immigration Research in US, 2021
- Recipient of John Simon Guggenheim Memorial Fellowship in Fiction, 2019
- Winner of an O. Henry Award, 2019
- Winner of the Dayton Literary Peace Prize for Fiction, 2017
- Recipient of a fellowship from the National Endowment for the Arts, 2014
- Winner of the Premio Biblioteca de Narrativa Colombiana, 2016
- Winner of the International Latino Book Award, 2014 and 2011
- Pen/Hemingway Foundation Fiction Award finalist, 2011
- New York Public Library Young Lions Fiction Award finalist, 2011
- Paterson Fiction Prize finalist, 2011
- Dayton Literary Peace Prize long list, 2011
- The Story Prize long list, 2011
