= Hernan Diaz (writer) =

Argentine and American writer (born 1973)

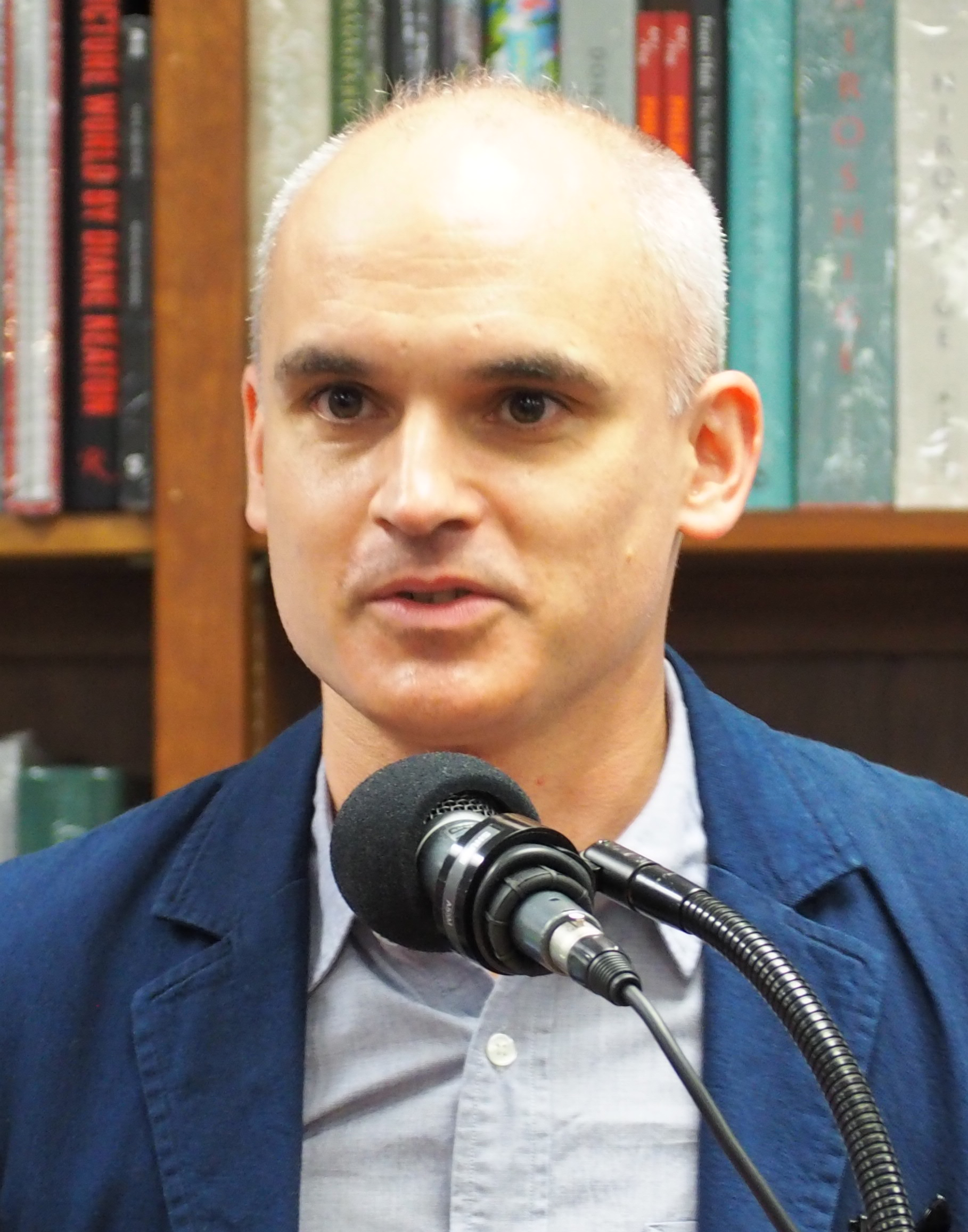
- Hernan Diaz in May 2022
- Born: 1973 (age 52–53)
- Education: University of Buenos Aires (Lic); King's College London (MA); New York University (PhD)
- Occupation: Novelist
- Writing career
- Period: 2017–present
- Notable works: In the Distance (2017); Trust (2022)
- Notable awards: Pulitzer Prize for Fiction (2023)

Hernan Diaz (Spanish: [eɾˈnan ˈdi.as]; born 1973) is an Argentine and American writer. His 2022 novel, Trust, was awarded the Pulitzer Prize for Fiction. His 2017 novel In the Distance was a finalist for the same Pulitzer Prize, as well as the PEN/Faulkner Award for Fiction. He also received a Whiting Award.

== Personal life ==
Diaz was born in Buenos Aires, Argentina. When he was two, his family moved to Sweden after the military coup. His family returned to Argentina after democracy was restored in 1983. Diaz was interested in writing at an early age, and even "pretended" to write, showing his parents his "stories." After obtaining a Licenciate degree in Literature (Licenciatura en Letras) in the University of Buenos Aires, Diaz moved to London to study an MA degree at King's College.

Diaz moved to New York in 1999 for additional studies. He received his PhD from New York University.

He lives in Brooklyn with his wife and daughter.

== Career ==
Diaz is the recipient of the John Updike award from the American Academy of Arts & Letters, given to “a writer whose contributions to American literature have demonstrated consistent excellence." He has received fellowships from the New York Public Library's Cullman Center for Scholars and Writers, the Rockefeller Foundation Bellagio Center, MacDowell, Yaddo, and the Ingmar Bergman Estate.

Diaz has published two novels, which have been published in more than 37 languages. His essays and short stories have been published in The Paris Review, Granta, Playboy, The Yale Review, and McSweeney's.

Borges, Between History and Eternity was published by Continuum on August 2, 2012. The book considers "key aspects of Borges's work — the reciprocal determinations of politics, philosophy and literature; the simultaneously confining and emancipating nature of language; and the incipient program for a literature of the Americas."

In the Distance was published on October 10, 2017 by Coffee House Press. Publishers Weekly, Feminist Press, PANK, and The Paris Review named it one of the top books of 2017, and Literary Hub named it one of "The 20 Best Novels of the Decade".

He was awarded a Guggenheim Fellowship in 2022, and in 2019, he won a Whiting Award, which is provided "based on the criteria of early-career achievement and the promise of superior literary work to come."

Trust was published by Riverhead Books on May 3, 2022. It received the 2022 Kirkus Prize and 2023 Pulitzer Prize for Fiction, and it was longlisted for the 2022 Booker Prize. It was also named one of the "10 Best Books of 2022" by The Washington Post and The New York Times, and it was named one of the New York Times’s Best 100 Books of the 21st Century.

== Awards ==
Year	Nominated work	Award	Category	Result	Ref.
2018	In the Distance	First Novelist Award	—	Winner	
2018	In the Distance	New American Voices Award	—	Winner	
2018	In the Distance	Prix du roman Page/America	—	Winner	
2018	In the Distance	William Saroyan International Prize for Writing	Fiction	Winner	
2018	In the Distance	PEN/Faulkner Award for Fiction	—	Finalist	
2018	In the Distance	Pulitzer Prize	Fiction	Finalist	
2022	Trust	Kirkus Prize	Fiction	Winner	
2023	Trust	Pulitzer Prize	Fiction	Winner	
2023	Trust	Booker Prize	—	Longlisted	

== Publications ==
=== Novels ===
- In the Distance (2017), ISBN 9781566894883
- Trust (2022), ISBN 9780593420317
- Ply (2026), ISBN 9780593719541

=== Nonfiction books ===
- Borges, Between History and Eternity (2012), ISBN 9781441197795

=== Short stories ===
- "The Wife of the Lion" (2018) in The Kenyon Review
- "1,111 Emblems" (2018) in Playboy
- "'I Am Going to Speak to You about Anxiety'" (2018) in Granta
- "The Stay" (2018) in The Paris Review
- "The World of Interiors" (2022) in McSweeney's Quarterly Concern
- "The Generation" (2022) in The Atlantic
- "Triptych" (2023) in Harper's Magazine

=== Essays ===
- "On Making Oneself Less Unreadable" (2017) in The Paris Review
- "If I Had a Sense of Beauty" (2017) in The Paris Review
- "Monument" (2017) on Kadist
- "On Joanna Walsh's Worlds from the Word's End" (2017) on Publishers Weekly
- "Who Gets to Be a Mad Scientist?" (2018) in The Paris Review
- "On Frankenstein, A Monster of a Book" (2018) in The Paris Review
- "We Stigmatize Accents, But Language Belongs To Everyone" (2018) on PBS NewsHour
- "A Year In Reading" (2018) on The Millions
- "Tove Jansson's 'The Island'" (2019) in The Paris Review (translation)
- "Tove Jansson's 'Once, At A Park'" (2019) in The Paris Review (translation)
- "A Reading List On Loneliness" (2020) in Electric Literature
- "The Heart of Fiction" (2021) in The Yale Review
- "Contemporary Authors On Their Favorite New York City Novels" (2022) in The New York Times
- "Let Me Tell You a True Story" (2023) on BookPage
- "Read Your Way Through New York City: On Brooklyn Heights" (2025) in The New York Times
