= Kelly Luce =

American writer

Kelly Luce is an American fiction writer and editor. She is the author of the short story collection Three Scenarios in Which Hana Sasaki Grows a Tail and the novel Pull Me Under. In 2016 she was named a fellow at the Radcliffe Institute for Advanced Study at Harvard University. She has contributed writing to New York Magazine,The Sun, The Southern Review, and The Chicago Tribune, and the New England Review.

Luce's story collection, Three Scenarios in Which Hana Sasaki Grows a Tail, was awarded Foreword Review's Editor's Choice Prize for Fiction as well as the IPBA Ben Franklin Award for Best First Book. It was published by A Strange Object and released in the US in 2013. A Chinese translation was published in 2021. A short film by Kevin Berlandi, "Hana Sasaki's Tail," adapted from the collection, premiered at Cannes Film Festival in 2016.

Luce's debut novel, Pull Me Under, was a Book of the Month Club selection and one of Elle magazine's Best Books of the year. The New York Times said the novel "wastes no time grabbing our attention," The Chicago Tribune called it "a splendid long hike," and O, the Oprah Magazine said "it will bewitch you." NPR named it a favorite book of the year and "a suspense novel with a female protagonist that gets more right about women than so many others I've read." It was published by in the U.S. by Farrar, Straus and Giroux on November 1, 2016, and was released in the UK in 2017, with translated editions in Japan, Poland, and Italy.

== Biography ==
Luce was born in Brookfield, Illinois. She studied Cognitive Science at Northwestern University, after which she moved to Kawasaki, Japan, followed by Tokushima, Japan. During her time in Japan she spent a week in jail under a false accusation of shoplifting. She received an MFA from the Michener Center for Writers in 2015. In addition to her writing, she works as a literary magazine editor with Electric Literature. She currently lives in Knoxville, Tennessee.

== Awards and honors ==
- Wachtmeister Award for Literary Excellence, Virginia Center for Creative Arts, 2023
- Tennessee Arts Commission Literary Fellowship, 2022
- The Corporation at Yaddo fellowship, 2019
- Radcliffe Institute for Advanced Study at Harvard University, 2016-2017
- MacDowell Colony Fellow, 2009, 2010, 2018
- Austin Public Library Friends Foundation, Illumine Award for Emerging Writer, 2014
- Ucross Foundation Fellowship, 2015
- James A. Michener Fellow in Writing, 2012–2015
