= Roger Reeves =

American poet (born 1980)

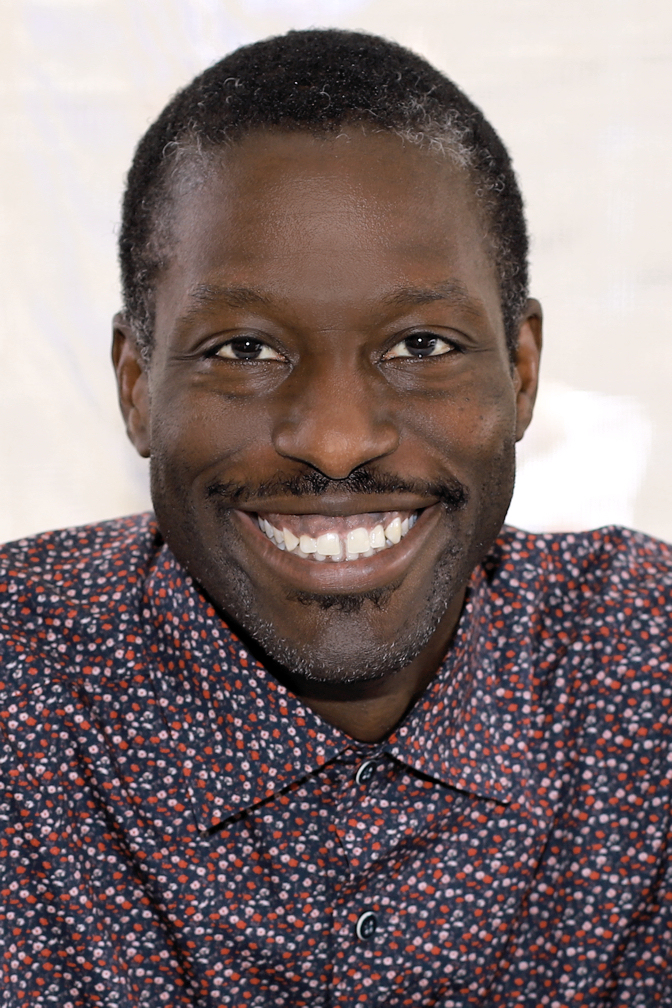
- Reeves at the 2022 Texas Book Festival.
- Born: Roger William Reeves; January 1980 (age 46); New Jersey, U.S.
- Education: Morehouse College (BA); Texas A & M University (MA); University of Texas at Austin (MFA, PhD)
- Occupations: Poet, Professor
- Writing career
- Genre: Poetry

Roger William Reeves (born January 1980) is an American poet and essayist.

== Life ==
=== Early life and education ===
Reeves was born and raised in southern New Jersey. He earned a Bachelor of Arts in English from Morehouse College, a Master of Arts in English from Texas A&M University, a Master of Fine Arts from the Michener Center for Creative Writing at the University of Texas at Austin, and a Doctor of Philosophy from the University of Texas at Austin.

=== Career ===
Reeves' work has appeared in Poetry, Ploughshares, The American Poetry Review, Boston Review, Gulf Coast, Tin House, and The Paris American. His debut collection of poetry, King Me, was published in 2013 by Copper Canyon Press and was honored as a Library Journal “Best Poetry Book of 2013.” His second collection of poetry, Best Barbarian, was published in 2022 by W.W. Norton and became a finalist for the National Book Award.

Reeves has been awarded a 2015 Whiting Award, a 2013 National Endowment of the Arts Fellowship, a 2013 Pushcart Prize, a 2008 Ruth Lilly Fellowship from the Poetry Foundation, two Bread Loaf Scholarships, an Alberta H. Walker Scholarship from the Provincetown Fine Arts Work Center and two Cave Canem Fellowships. For the 2014–2015 school year, Reeves was a Hodder Fellow of Princeton University.

Reeves was an assistant professor of poetry at the University of Illinois Chicago, and is now an associate professor of English at the University of Texas at Austin. In 2021, he was awarded the Suzanne Young Murray Fellowship at Harvard Radcliffe Institute. In 2023, Reeves received a Guggenheim Fellowship and a Kingsley Tufts Poetry Award.

His book Best Barbarian was the winner of the 2023 Griffin Poetry Prize.

== Awards and honors ==
Reeves has received multiple notable fellowships and scholarships, including two Bread Loaf scholarships, two Cave Canem fellowships, the Ruth Lilly Fellowship from the Poetry Foundation (2008), the Hodder fellowship from Princeton University (2014-15), the Suzanne Young Murray Fellowship at Harvard Radcliffe Institute (2021), and a Guggenheim Fellowship (2023), as well as a fellowship from the National Endowment of the Arts (2013).

In 2013, Library Journal named King Me one of the year's best books of poetry.

Awards for Reeves's writing
| Year | Title | Award | | Result | Ref. |
|---|---|---|---|---|---|
| 2013 | "The Field Museum" | Pushcart Prize | — | Winner | |
| 2015 | — | Whiting Award | Poetry | Winner | |
| 2015 | King Me | Hurston/Wright Legacy Award | Poetry | Finalist | |
| 2022 | Best Barbarian | National Book Award | Poetry | Finalist | |
| 2023 | Best Barbarian | Griffin Poetry Prize | — | Winner | |
| 2023 | Best Barbarian | Hurston/Wright Legacy Award | Poetry | Nominee | |
| 2023 | Best Barbarian | Kingsley Tufts Poetry Award | — | Winner | |

== Books ==
- King Me. Copper Canyon Press. 2013. ISBN 978-1-55659-448-9.
- Best Barbarian. W.W. Norton. 2022. ISBN 978-0-393-60933-2.
- Dark Days: Fugitive Essays. Graywolf Press. 2023. ISBN 9781644452417.
