= Michael Dickman =

American poet

- Born: August 20, 1975 (age 51); Portland, Oregon, U.S.
- Citizenship: American
- Occupation: Poet
- Children: 2
- Writing career
- Language: English
- Notable awards: 2008 Narrative Prize by Narrative Magazine; 2010 James Laughlin Award from the Academy of American Poets

Michael Dickman is an American poet born August 20, 1975, in Portland, Oregon. His work has appeared in The New Yorker, The American Poetry Review, Field, Tin House, and Narrative Magazine. Michael Dickman currently teaches at Princeton University.

== Education and background ==
Dickman attended and graduated from La Salle Catholic College Preparatory, after which he attended five colleges (Portland State, the University of San Francisco, Portland Community College, Marylhurst University, and the University of Oregon). He received a fellowship from The James A. Michener Center for Writers at the University of Texas. In 2009, he received an Alfred Hodder Fellowship at Princeton University.

== Career ==
His poem "Returning to Church" was awarded the 2008 Narrative Prize by Narrative Magazine. Dickman's first book, The End of the West, was published in 2009 by Copper Canyon Press. His second book, Flies (Copper Canyon Press, 2011), won the 2010 James Laughlin Award from the Academy of American Poets. He is also the coauthor, with his twin brother Matthew Dickman, of the 2012 poetry collection 50 American Plays, published by Copper Canyon Press.

He and his brother Matthew starred as the pre-cog twins, Arthur and Dashiell respectively, in the 2002 Steven Spielberg film Minority Report.

Michael and Matthew Dickman were the subject of an April 6, 2009, New Yorker profile.

Michael Dickman's poem "Scholls Ferry Rd.," published in Poetry Magazine in 2020, received criticism for its use of racist language. Don Share, the Editor in Chief of Poetry, subsequently resigned.

== Family ==
He is married and has two children.

== Bibliography ==
=== Collections ===
- —— (2009). The End of the West. Port Townsend, Washington: Copper Canyon Press. ISBN 9781556592898.
- —— (2011). Flies. Port Townsend, Washington: Copper Canyon Press.
- —— & Dickman, Matthew (2012). 50 American Plays: Poems. Port Townsend, Washington: Copper Canyon Press. ISBN 9781556593932.
- —— (2016). Green Migraine. Port Townsend, Washington: Copper Canyon Press.
- —— (2019). Days & Days.

=== List of poems ===
Title	Year	First published	Reprinted/collected
From the canal	2013	Dickman, Michael (May 6, 2013). "From the canal". The New Yorker. Vol. 89, no. 12. p. 36.	
Hotel days	2019	Dickman, Michael (March 4, 2019). "Hotel days". The New Yorker. Vol. 95, no. 2. pp. 42–43.	
Mouse Hunt	2014	Dickman, Michael (September 1, 2014). "Mouse hunt". The New Yorker. Vol. 90, no. 25. pp. 46–47.	
Lakes Rivers Streams	2018	Dickman, Michael (July 2018). "Lakes Rivers Streams". Poetry.	
