= Shara Lessley =

American poet

Shara Lessley is an American poet and essayist.

== Early life ==
Lessley was born in Visalia, California in 1975. She attended the University of California, Irvine. An ArtsBridge Scholar, she earned undergraduate degrees in English and Dance. Shara received an M.F.A. in Poetry from the University of Maryland's creative writing program.

== Career ==
Lessley is the author of two full-length collections of poetry, The Explosive Expert's Wife (University of Wisconsin Press), a Rumpus Poetry Book selection, and Two-Headed Nightingale (New Issues Poetry & Prose). With the poet Bruce Snider, Lessley co-edited The Poem's Country: Place & Poetic Practice (Pleiades Press), an anthology of essays.

Lessley's writing has been published widely, appearing in newspapers and magazines such as The San Francisco Chronicle, Poetry Daily, The Kenyon Review, Missouri Review, and 32 Poems, as well as in numerous anthologies. Her poems have earned awards including Southern Indiana Review's Patricia Aakhus Award for the best work across all genres in a given year, the Collins Prize from Birmingham Poetry Review, New England Poetry Club's 2015 Erika Mumford Prize, and a Discovery / The Nation Prize from The Nation, among others. The editors of Best American Essays 2016 listed Lessley's "Point Blank" as a "Notable Essay."

Lessley is a contributing editor at West Branch, where she writes an annual column on contemporary poetry. Lessley is also the assistant poetry editor for Acre Books. She has taught literature and writing both in the United States and abroad at universities and schools including University of Wisconsin–Madison, Colgate University, Washington College, and The Gilman School, as well as for Stanford University's Online Continuing Studies Program for creative writing. She was the inaugural Anne-Spencer-Poet-in-Residence at Randolph College.

== Select awards and fellowships ==
- Wallace Stegner Fellowship in Poetry: Stanford University (2003–2005)
- Olive B. O'Connor Fellowship in Creative Writing: Colgate University (2006)
- Reginald S. Tickner Fellowship in Creative Writing: The Gilman School (2007)
- Diane K. Middlebrook Poetry Fellowship: University of Wisconsin Institute for Creative Writing (2008)
- John Ciardi Scholar in Poetry: Bread Loaf Writers' Conference (http://www.middlebury.edu/bread-loaf-conferences) (2008)
- North Carolina Arts Council: Artist Fellowship (2010)
- Mary Wood Fellowship: Washington College, Rose O'Neill Literary House (2014)
- National Endowment for the Arts: Individual Fellowship in Poetry (2015)

== Books ==
- The Explosive Expert's Wife (University of Wisconsin Press, 2018)
- The Poem's Country: Place & Poetic Practice (Pleiades Press, 2018) co-editor
- Two-Headed Nightingale (New Issues Poetry & Prose, 2012)
