= The Association of Small Bombs =

2016 novel by Karan Mahajan

- First edition
- Author: Karan Mahajan
- Publisher: Viking Press
- Publication date: 2016
- Publication place: United States
- Media type: Print (Paperback)
- Pages: 288 pages
- ISBN: 978-0-525-42963-0

The Association of Small Bombs is a 2016 novel by Indian-American author and novelist Karan Mahajan. The novel is Mahajan's second, after 2012's Family Planning, and was first published in 2016 by Viking Press. The novel was named a finalist for the 2016 National Book Award for Fiction.

The novel opens with a bombing in a New Delhi marketplace in 1996 and explores the resultant trauma caused by the attack, examining it from the perspective of the victims, their families, and the perpetrators.

== Plot ==
The novel opens with the detonation of a bomb by a Kashmiri man, Shockie. The bomb kills thirteen and injures a further thirty. The remainder of the novel alternates between the perspective of Shockie, those who were injured, and those who lost family in the explosion.
