= Seeking Fortune Elsewhere =

Sindya Bhanoo collection of short stories

- Front cover for Seeking Fortune Elsewhere
- Author: Sindya Bhanoo
- Genre: Short Stories
- Publisher: Catapult
- Publication date: March 2022

Seeking Fortune Elsewhere is a collection of eight short stories by Sindya Bhanoo. The stories are distantly connected with one another and explore the topics of isolation and immigration, particularly as it relates to South Indian immigrants.

== Context ==
Bhanoo's debut collection of eight short stories, Seeking Fortune Elsewhere, was written over a period of three years. The focus of the stories is on South Indian immigrants and women. When asked about the focus on immigrants, Bhanoo stated, "I write fiction because I think there are certain stories and people absent from the larger record. All too often, the stories of immigrants, of women, of those from marginalized communities are absent from the archive. Fiction gives us a chance to go back and correct that, not completely, but partially." Four of the stories are set in India and four in the United States.

== Short stories ==
=== Malliga Homes ===
An aging woman is living in a retirement home in Tamil Nadu, away from her daughter Kamala in Atlanta, Georgia. Kamala's mother is the narrator of the story and considers the home “a place for those who have nowhere else to go.” Living in Atlanta doesn't interest her either; she yearns for old customs, for a time when children lived close to their parents and did not move away “to seek their fortunes elsewhere."

=== A Life in America ===
A professor finds himself accused of having exploited his graduate students.

=== Buddymoon ===
A divorced woman goes to her daughter's wedding, only to feel throughout as though she is on the outside looking in.

=== Amma ===
Amma begins, “Before all of this, before they prostrated at her feet, before she wore large, round, dark red bottus with light red namams on her forehead, she was one of us. Before she became chief minister, before she became a star, she was our classmate at Sacred Heart Girls School in Church Park.” The story explores women who were children together and their humdrum lives as their classmate rises to fame.

=== Nature Exchange ===
The granddaughter of the narrator in Malliga Homes must learn to move on after the tragic death of her son.

=== His Holiness ===
In His Holiness a girl's father has become a guru, switching out his academic clothes for robes, his photograph now in the place of honor in the home.

=== No. 16 Model House Road ===
A long-married woman seeks independence after decades of letting her husband make decisions on her behalf.

=== Three Trips ===
Explores three trips taken by an Indian American and her fractured family.

== Critical reception ==
Seeking Fortune Elsewhere received stellar reviews, including from notable publications such as The New York Times, "These stories rattle and shake with the heartache of separation," and the Harvard Review, "Seeking Fortune Elsewhere achieves a level of poignancy most writers can only dream of. A veteran journalist, Bhanoo's handle on tight storytelling is a strength in this lean collection. Her straightforward writing style allows for a unified flow, keeping the focus squarely on the difficult questions these eight stories ask about dislocation."

== Awards ==
- New American Voices Award, 2022
- Oregon Book Award, Ken Kesey Award for Fiction, 2023
- Finalist for the PEN/Robert W. Bingham Prize for Debut Short Story Collection, 2023
- Longlisted for the Andrew Carnegie Medal for Excellence in Fiction, 2023
- O. Henry Award for the short story Malliga Homes, 2021
