= Rachel Heng =

Singaporean novelist (born 1988)

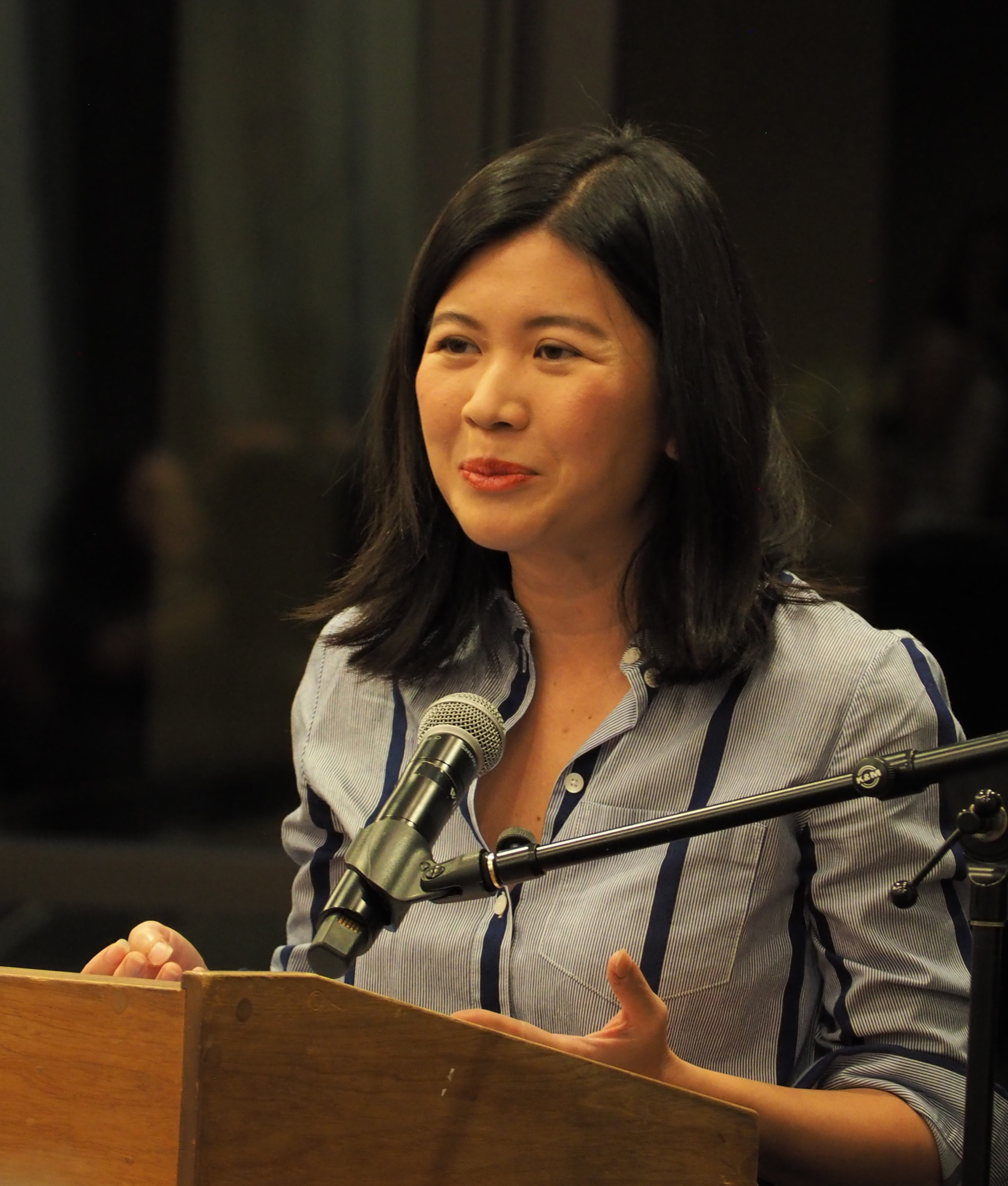
- Reading at Fall for the Book, 12 October 2023
- Born: 13 May 1988 (age 38); Singapore
- Education: Columbia University (BA in Comparative Literature); University of Texas at Austin (MFA in Fiction)
- Occupations: Novelist, short story writer
- Writing career
- Notable works: Suicide Club (2018); The Great Reclamation (2023)
- Website: rachelhengqp.com

Rachel Heng (born 13 May 1988) is a Singaporean novelist and the author of literary dystopian novel Suicide Club (2018) and award-winning The Great Reclamation (2023). Her short fiction has been published in many literary journals including The New Yorker, Glimmer Train, Tin House, and The Minnesota Review. Her fiction has received recognition from the Pushcart Prize, the Andrew Carnegie Medals for Excellence, and the New American Voices Award by the Institute for Immigration Research, and she has been profiled by the BBC, Electric Literature, and other publications.

== Early life and education ==
Rachel Heng majored in comparative literature at Columbia University, graduating in 2011. She then worked in the private equity industry in London. She received a James A. Michener Fellowship to pursue a MFA in fiction and screenwriting at the University of Texas at Austin's Michener Center for Writers.

== Career ==
Heng's first novel Suicide Club was published by Hachette's Sceptre imprint in the UK, and Macmillan's Henry Holt imprint in the US in July 2018. The manuscript won a six-figure publishing deal after a bidding auction between international publishers. The novel is a piece of dystopian fiction set in a world of compulsory state-managed longevity, and satirizes contemporary culture's obsession with health. The plot centers on a group of rebels called the "Suicide Club" which circulates secretly-filmed videos of their own suicides as a form of release and protest against the health-obsessed establishment. The novel was inspired by dystopian pieces such as George Orwell's Animal Farm and Margaret Atwood's The Handmaid's Tale. Heng's novel was named a most anticipated novel of the summer by The Huffington Post, Gizmodo, The Irish Times, The Millions, Bustle, Nylon and Elle. Critics have compared Suicide Club favourably to Kazuo Ishiguro's Never Let Me Go, Chuck Palahniuk's Fight Club and Oscar Wilde's The Picture of Dorian Gray. Suicide Club had been translated into 10 languages worldwide.

Her second novel The Great Reclamation was published by Riverhead Books in March 2023. It won the New American Voices Award in 2023, was longlisted for the Andrew Carnegie Medal for Excellence 2024, and was named a New York Times Editors' Choice and a "Best Book of 2023 So Far" by The New Yorker and Amazon Books.

Heng's short fiction has been published widely in literary journals such as The New Yorker, Glimmer Train, Tin House, Prairie Schooner, The Offing, Timothy McSweeney's Quarterly Concern, and The Minnesota Review. Her fiction has received a Pushcart special mention and Prairie Schooner's Jane Geske Award. She has written essays and features for The Telegraph, The Rumpus, Grazia and Catapult. Her essay "On Becoming a Person of Colour' was one of The Rumpus's top read posts of 2018, a 2018 Staff Pick and has been nominated for a Pushcart Prize. She was listed by The Independent as one of ten emerging authors to look out for in 2018 and has been profiled by outlets such as the BBC, Electric Literature and The Straits Times. In 2021, she was longlisted for the Sunday Times Audible Short Story Award.

== Bibliography ==
- —— (2018). Suicide Club. Hachette, Henry Holt. ISBN 9781473672918.
- —— (2023). The Great Reclamation. Penguin Random House and Riverhead Books. ISBN 9780593420119.

== See also ==
- List of Singaporean writers
