= In the Distance =

2017 novel by Hernán Diaz

- Author: Hernan Diaz
- Language: English
- Genre: Western; Magic realism; Bildungsroman
- Publisher: Coffee House Press
- Publication date: October 10, 2017
- Publication place: United States
- Media type: Print (Paperback)
- Pages: 256
- ISBN: 978-1-56689-488-3
- OCLC: 975018812
- Dewey Decimal: 813/.6
- LC Class: PS3604.I17 I5 2017

In the Distance is a 2017 novel by writer and professor Hernán Diaz. The story recounts the life of Håkan, a Swedish emigrant who is separated from his brother on their journey to the United States in the mid-19th century. Penniless, Håkan travels across the American West, sometimes in very harsh conditions, with the goal of finding his brother in New York City.

== Writing and composition ==
The novel took six years to write. Diaz was drawn to the Western genre as he thought it had not "[fulfilled] its promise or potential". Diaz wrote the book in Manhattan and Brooklyn.

== Reception ==
Carys Davies, for The Guardian, referred to the novel as a "thrilling narrative, full of twists and turns". Catherine Taylor, for the Financial Times, praised In the Distance as an "extraordinary epic tale".

The novel was a finalist for the PEN/Faulkner Award for Fiction and the Pulitzer Prize.
