= Booklist Editors' Choice =

Annual booklist

Booklist Editors' Choice is an annual list compiled and reviewed by Booklist's editorial staff as the best adult and youth books and videos, and audiobooks. Booklist is a publication "that has been published by the American Library Association for more than 100 years, and is widely viewed as offering the most reliable reviews to help libraries decide what to buy and to help library patrons and students decide what to read, view, or listen to." The list is separated into nine categories: adult and youth fiction, adult and youth nonfiction, youth picture book, adult and youth graphic novels, and adult and youth audiobooks.

== Recipients ==
Booklist Top of the List
Year	Category	Author(s)	Title
2018	Adult Nonfiction	Susan Orlean	The Library Book
2018	Adult Audio	Rachel Kushner	The Mars Room
2018	Youth Picture Book	Madeline Miller	Circe
2018	Youth Nonfiction	Jarrett J. Krosoczka	Hey, Kiddo
2018	Youth Fiction	Joy McCullough	Blood Water Paint
2018	Youth Audio	Linda Bailey with Júlia Sardà (Illus.)	Mary Who Wrote Frankenstein
2019	Adult Fiction	Salman Rushdie	Quichotte
2019	Adult Nonfiction	Marie Arana	Silver, Sword, and Stone: Three Crucibles in the Latin American Story
2019	Adult Audio	Elizabeth McCracken	Bowlaway
2019	Youth Picture Book	Eliza Wheeler	Home in the Woods
2019	Youth Nonfiction	Carlyn Beccia	Monstrous: The Lore, Gore, and Science behind Your Favorite Monsters
2019	Youth Fiction	Ryan Andrews	This Was Our Pact
2019	Youth Audio	Laurie Halse Anderson	Shout
2020	Graphic Novels for Adults	Tian Veasna with Helge Dascher (Illus.)	Year of the Rabbit
2020	Adult Fiction	Maisy Card	These Ghosts Are Family
2020	Adult Nonfiction	Morgan Jerkins	Wandering in Strange Lands: A Daughter of the Great Migration
2020	Adult Audio	Abi Daré with Adjoa Andoh (narrator)	The Girl with the Louding Voice
2020	Graphic Novels for Youth	Gene Luen Yang with Lark Pien (Illus.)	Dragon Hoops
2020	Youth Picture Book	Tricia Elam Walker with April Harrison (Illus.)	Nana Akua Goes to School
2020	Youth Nonfiction	Christina Soontornvat	All Thirteen: The Incredible Cave Rescue of the Thai Boys’ Soccer Team
2020	Youth Fiction	Patrick Ness	Burn
2020	Youth Audio	Elizabeth Acevedo with Melania Luisa Marte (narrator)	Clap When You Land
2021	Adult Nonfiction	Winfred Rembert and Erin I. Kelly	Chasing Me to My Grave: An Artist’s Memoir of the Jim Crow South
2021	Adult Fiction	Louise Erdrich	The Sentence
2021	Adult Graphic Novel	Margaret Kimball	And Now I Spill the Family Secrets
2021	Adult Audio	P. Djèlí Clark with Suehyla El-Attar (narrator)	A Master of Djinn
2021	Youth Nonfiction	Paula Yoo	From a Whisper to a Rallying Cry: The Killing of Vincent Chin and the Trial That Galvanized the Asian American Movement
2021	Youth Fiction	Jennifer L. Holm	The Lion of Mars
2021	Picture Book	Phoebe Wahl	Little Witch Hazel
2021	Youth Graphic Novel	Harmony Becker	Himawari House
2021	Youth Audio	Angeline Boulley with Isabella Star LaBlanc (narrator)	Firekeeper's Daughter
2022	Adult Nonfiction	Dipo Faloyin	Africa Is Not a Country: Notes on a Bright Continent
2022	Adult Fiction	Julie Otsuka	The Swimmers
2022	Adult Graphic Novel	Kate Beaton	Ducks: Two Years in the Oil Sands
2022	Adult Audio	Anne Griffin with Nicola Coughlan (narrator)	Listening Still
2022	Youth Nonfiction	Elizabeth Partridge with Lauren Tamaki (Illus.)	Seen and Unseen: What Dorothea Lange, Toyo Miyatake, and Ansel Adams’s Photographs Reveal about the Japanese American Incarceration
2022	Youth Fiction	Sabaa Tahir	All My Rage
2022	Picture Book	Ellen Heck	A Is for Bee: An Alphabet Book in Translation
2022	Youth Graphic Novel	Reimena Yee	My Aunt Is a Monster
2022	Youth Audio	Nadine Neema	Journal of a Traveling Girl
2023	Adult Nonfiction	Melissa L. Sevigny	Brave the Wild River: The Untold Story of Two Women Who Mapped the Botany of the Grand Canyon
2023	Adult Fiction	Ana Menéndez	The Apartment
2023	Adult Graphic Novel	Deena Mohamed	Shubeik Lubeik
2023	Adult Audio	Chandler Baker with January LaVoy (narrator)	Cutting Teeth
2023	Youth Nonfiction	Nicholas Day with by Brett Helquist (illus.)	The Mona Lisa Vanishes: A Legendary Painter, a Shocking Heist, and the Birth of a Global Celebrity
2023	Youth Graphic Novel	Zach Weinersmith with Boulet (illus.)	Bea Wolf
2023	Middle Grade Fiction	Gary D. Schmidt	The Labors of Hercules Beal
2023	Picture Book	Monica Arnaldo	Mr. S
2023	Young Adult Fiction	Justine Pucella Winans	Bianca Torre Is Afraid of Everything
2023	Youth Audio	Claire Swinarski with full cast (narration)	What Happened to Rachel Riley?
2024	Adult Nonfiction	Lydia Millet	We Loved It All: A Memory of Life
2024	Adult Fiction	Tommy Orange	Wandering Stars
2024	Adult Graphic Novel	Tessa Hulls	Feeding Ghosts
2024	Adult Audio	Xochitl Gonzalez with full cast (narration)	Anita de Monte Laughs Last
2024	Youth Nonfiction	Elizabeth Rusch	A Greater Goal: The Epic Battle for Equal Pay in Women’s Soccer—and Beyond
2024	Youth Graphic Novel	Jen Wang	Ash's Cabin
2024	Middle Grade Fiction	Preston Norton	The House on Yeet Street
2024	Picture Book	Kiley Frank with K-Fai Steele (illus.)	That Always Happens Sometimes
2024	Young Adult Fiction	Olivia A. Cole	Ariel Crashes a Train
2024	Youth Audio	Desmond Hall with Jaime Lincoln Smith (narrator)	Better Must Come
