= Rise: A Feminist Book Project =

ALA children's book list

Rise: A Feminist Book Project, formerly known as the Amelia Bloomer Project and compiled by the American Library Association, is an annual list of books with significant feminist content that are intended for readers from birth to age 18. The Amelia Bloomer Project was started in 2002 and continued annually until the name change in 2020. Rise is unique from other book lists in that it selects books based on content.

Researchers, librarians, and educators have used the list to recognize and select books with feminist content for young people.

== History ==
The American Library Association's Feminist Task Force (FTF) of the Social Responsibilities Round Table initiated an annual curation of the top feminist books in 2002 to promote "quality feminist literature for young readers". The FTF chose to name the project after Amelia Bloomer, "an American writer and newspaper editor who campaigned for temperance, women's rights, and dress reform."

In 2020, the FTF decided to rename the annual book list to Rise: A Feminist Book Project. The name change came after the FTF learned that Amelia Bloomer "refused to speak against the Fugitive Slave Law of 1850". The committee stated that "librarians and libraries must work to correct social problems and inequities with particular attention to intersectionality, feminism, and deliberate anti-racism". This belief prompted the 2020 name change.

== Criteria ==
The judges consider both fiction and nonfictional, as well as illustrated books that have been published in the previous 18 months.

Every year, books are judged based on three main criteria:

1. Significant feminist content
2. Directed toward readers between ages 0 to 18
3. Literary and artistic merit

The books selected for the project fall into six categories based on target audience and genre: Early Readers Fiction and Nonfiction, Middle Grade Fiction and Nonfiction, and Young Adult Fiction and Nonfiction.

== Impact ==
In 2016, Kimberly Campbell Kinnaird selected 27 historical fiction novels from the Amelia Bloomer Project to "examine authenticity and empowerment" using "Boreen's three stages of historical authenticity (1999) and Brown and St. Clair's three levels of female empowerment (2002)". Kinnaird's study found the books highly correlated with "female protagonists' authenticity and empowerment." The books included female characters that acted "courageously within society's bounds," defied "society for personal ambition," and acted "as a catalyst for change."

== Honorees ==
The American Library Association's Feminist Task Force of the Social Responsibilities Round Table selects books annually for Rise: A Feminist Book Project in six categories based on target audience and genre: Early Readers Fiction and Nonfiction, Middle Grade Fiction and Nonfiction, and Young Adult Fiction and Nonfiction.

The following lists the top ten books between 2013 and 2021. Before 2013, the Feminist Task Force did not select the top ten books.

RISE: Top Ten (2013-2021)
Year	Audience	Genre	Title	Author
2013	Early Readers	Nonfiction	In the Bag!: Margaret Knight Wraps It Up	Monica Kulling, illus. by David Parkins
2013	Early Readers	Nonfiction	Heart on Fire: Susan B. Anthony Votes for President	Ann Malaspina, illus. by Steve James
2013	Early Readers	Nonfiction	Dolores Huerta: A Hero to Migrant Workers	Sarah E. Warren with Robert Casilla (Illus.)
2013	Young Adult	Fiction	Womanthology: Heroic	Various
2013	Young Adult	Fiction	Code Name Verity	Elizabeth Wein
2013	Young Adult	Nonfiction	King Peggy: An American Secretary, Her Royal Destiny, and the Inspiring Story of How She Changed an African Village	Peggielene Bartels and Eleanor Herman
2013	Young Adult	Nonfiction	Rookie Yearbook One	Tavi Gevinson (editor)
2013	Young Adult	Nonfiction	Grace and Grit: My Fight for Equal Pay and Fairness at Goodyear and Beyond	Lilly Ledbetter with Lanier Scott Isom
2013	Young Adult	Nonfiction	A Little F'd Up: Why Feminism Is Not a Dirty Word	Julie Zeilinger
2014	Early Readers	Nonfiction	Global Baby Girls	Global Fund for Children
2014	Early Readers	Nonfiction	Flying Solo: How Ruth Elder Soared into America's Heart	Julie Cummins, illus. by Malene R. Laugesen
2014	Early Readers	Nonfiction	Brave Girl: Clara and the Shirtwaist Makers' Strike of 1909	Michelle Markel with Melissa Sweet (Illus.)
2014	Middle Grade	Nonfiction	Profiles: Freedom Heroines	Frieda Wishinsky
2014	Young Adult	Nonfiction	However Long the Night: Molly Melching's Journey to Help Millions of African Women and Girls Triumph	Aimee Molloy
2014	Young Adult	Nonfiction	Double Victory: How African American Women Broke Race and Gender Barriers to Help Win World War II	Cheryl Mullenbach
2014	Young Adult	Nonfiction	The Good Girls Revolt: How the Women of Newsweek Sued Their Bosses and Changed the Workplace	Lynn Povich
2014	Young Adult	Nonfiction	I am Malala: The Girl Who Stood Up for Education and Was Shot by the Taliban	Malala Yousafzai with Christina Lamb
2014	Young Adult	Nonfiction	What Will It Take to Make a Woman President?	Marianne Schnall
2014	Young Adult	Nonfiction	Rookie Yearbook Two	Tavi Gevinson (editor)
2015	Early Readers	Fiction	A Pair of Twins	Kavitha Mandana, illus. by Nayantara Surendranath
2015	Early Readers	Nonfiction	Every Day Is Malala Day	Rosemary McCarney with Plan International
2015	Middle Grade	Fiction	Hidden	Donna Jo Napoli
2015	Middle Grade	Nonfiction	A Woman in the House (and Senate): How Women Came to the United States Congress, Broke Down Barriers, and Changed the Country	Ilene Cooper, illus. by Elizabeth Baddeley
2015	Middle Grade	Nonfiction	Because I Am a Girl: I Can Change the World	Rosemary McCarney with Plan International
2015	Middle Grade	Nonfiction	I Am Malala: How One Girl Stood Up for Education and Changed the World: Young Readers Edition	Malala Yousafzai with Patricia McCormick
2015	Young Adult	Fiction	My Notorious Life	Katy Manning
2015	Young Adult	Fiction	Tomboy: A Graphic Memoir	Liz Prince
2015	Young Adult	Fiction	Ms. Marvel: No Normal	G. Willow Wilson, illus. by Adrian Alphona
2015	Young Adult	Nonfiction	Sally Ride: America's First Woman in Space	Lynn Sherr
2016	Early Readers	Fiction	Drum Dream Girl: How One Girl's Courage Changed Music	Margarita Engle, illus. by Rafael López
2016	Early Readers	Nonfiction	Swing Sisters: The Story of the International Sweethearts of Rhythm	Karen Deans, illus. by Joe Cepeda
2016	Middle Grade	Nonfiction	Voice of Freedom: Fannie Lou Hamer: The Spirit of the Civil Rights Movement	Carole Boston Weatherford, illus. by Ekua Holmes
2016	Middle Grade	Nonfiction	Sally Ride: A Photobiography of America's Pioneering Woman in Space	Tam O'Shaughnessy
2016	Young Adult	Fiction	The Boston Girl	Anita Diamant
2016	Young Adult	Fiction	Devoted	Jennifer Mathieu
2016	Young Adult	Nonfiction	We Should All Be Feminists	Chimamanda Ngozi Adichie
2016	Young Adult	Nonfiction	Notorious RBG: The Life and Times of Ruth Bader Ginsburg	Irin Carmon and Shana Knizhnik
2016	Young Adult	Nonfiction	The Born Frees: Writing with the Girls of Gugulethu	Kimberly Burge and Lynn Sherr
2016	Young Adult	Nonfiction	African American Women: Photographs from the National Museum of African American History and Culture	
2017	Early Readers	Nonfiction	I Dissent: Ruth Bader Ginsburg Makes Her Mark	Debbie Levy, illus. by Elizabethe Baddeley
2017	Early Readers	Nonfiction	Ada Lovelace, Poet of Science: The First Computer Programmer	Diane Stanley, illus. by Jessie Hartland
2017	Young Adult	Fiction	Burn Baby Burn	Meg Medina
2017	Young Adult	Fiction	Exit, Pursued by a Bear	E. K. Johnston
2017	Young Adult	Fiction	The Lie Tree	Frances Hardinge
2017	Young Adult	Nonfiction	Balcony on the Moon	Ibtisam Barakat
2017	Young Adult	Nonfiction	Becoming Unbecoming	Una
2017	Young Adult	Nonfiction	Take It As a Compliment	Maria Stoian
2017	Young Adult	Nonfiction	Trainwreck: The Women We Love to Hate, Mock, and Fear... and Why	Sady Doyle
2017	Young Adult	Nonfiction	We Believe You: Survivors of Campus Sexual Assault Speak Out	Annie E. Clark and Andrea L. Pino
2018	Early Readers	Fiction	Hand Over Hand	Alma Fullerton, illus. by Renné Benoit
2018	Early Readers	Nonfiction	Malala's Magic Pencil	Malala Yousafzai, illus. by Kerascoët
2018	Early Readers	Nonfiction	Shark Lady: The True Story of How Eugenie Clark Became the Ocean's Most Fearless Scientist	Jess Keating, illus. by Marta Alvarez Miguens
2018	Middle Grade	Fiction	Ahimsa	Supriya Kelkar
2018	Young Adult	Fiction	Noteworthy	Riley Redgate
2018	Young Adult	Fiction	Piecing Me Together	Renée Watson
2018	Young Adult	Fiction	Saints and Misfits	S.K. Ali
2018	Young Adult	Fiction	The One Hundred Nights of Hero	Isabel Greenberg
2018	Young Adult	Nonfiction	#NotYourPrincess: Voices of Native American Women	Lisa Charleyboy and Mary Beth Leatherdale (editors)
2018	Young Adult	Nonfiction	Girl Rising: Changing the World One Girl at a Time	Tanya Lee Stone
2019	Early Readers	Fiction	Sugar and Snails	Sarah Tsiang with Sonja Wimmer
2019	Middle Grade	Fiction	Crush	Svetlana Chmakova
2019	Middle Grade	Fiction	Amal Unbound	Aisha Saeed
2019	Young Adult	Fiction	The Poet X	Elizabeth Acevedo
2019	Young Adult	Fiction	Speak: The Graphic Novel	Laurie Halse Anderson, illus. by Emily Carroll
2019	Young Adult	Fiction	Damsel	Elana K. Arnold
2019	Young Adult	Fiction	As the Crow Flies	Melanie Gillman
2019	Young Adult	Fiction	Learning to Breathe	Janice Lynn Mather
2019	Young Adult	Fiction	Blood Water Paint	Joy McCullough
2019	Young Adult	Fiction	Naondel	Maria Turtschaninoff
2020	Early Readers	Fiction	A Boy Like You	Frank Murphy, illus. by Kayla Harren
2020	Early Readers	Fiction	At the Mountain's Base	Traci Sorell with Weshoyot Alvitre
2020	Early Readers	Fiction	The Proudest Blue: A Story of Hijab and Family	Ibtihaj Muhammad, illus. by S.K. Ali and Hatem Aly
2020	Early Readers	Nonfiction	Rise! From Caged Bird to Poet of the People, Maya Angelou	Bethany Hegedus, illus. by Tonya Engel
2020	Early Readers	Nonfiction	What Do You Do With a Voice Like That? The Story of Extraordinary Congresswoman Barbara Jordan	Chris Barton, illus. by Ekua Holmes
2020	Young Adult	Fiction	Forward Me Back to You	Mitali Perkins
2020	Young Adult	Fiction	Surviving the City, Vol. 1	Tasha Spillett and Natasha Donovan
2020	Young Adult	Fiction	Thirteen Doorways, Wolves Behind Them All	Laura Ruby
2020	Young Adult	Fiction	We Set the Dark on Fire	Tehlor Kay Mejia
2020	Young Adult	Nonfiction	Shout	Laurie Halse Anderson
2021	Early Readers	Nonfiction	Consent (For Kids!): Boundaries, Respect, and Being in Charge of You	Rachel Brian
2021	Early Readers	Nonfiction	It Began with a Page: How Gyo Fujikawa Drew the Way	Kyo Maclear, illus. by Julie Morstad
2021	Early Readers	Nonfiction	Ritu Weds Chandni	Ameya Narvankar
2021	Early Readers	Nonfiction	Ruth Objects: The Life of Ruth Bader Ginsburg	Doreen Rappaport, illus. by Eric Velasquez
2021	Young Adult	Fiction	Clap When You Land	Elizabeth Acevedo
2021	Young Adult	Fiction	Red Hood	Elana K. Arnold
2021	Young Adult	Fiction	Every Body Looking	Candice Iloh
2021	Young Adult	Nonfiction	Say Her Name	Zetta Elliot
2021	Young Adult	Nonfiction	Know My Name: A Memoir	Chanel Miller
2022	Early Readers	Fiction	Laxmi's Mooch	Shelly Anand, illus. by Nabi H. Ali
2022	Early Readers	Fiction	The Big Bath House	Kyo Maclear, illus by Gracey Zhang
2022	Early Readers	Nonfiction	Bodies Are Cool	Tyler Feder
2022	Young Adult	Fiction	Firekeeper's Daughter	Angeline Boulley
2022	Young Adult	Fiction	Last Night at the Telegraph Club	Malinda Lo
2022	Young Adult	Fiction	Sistersong	Lucy Holland
2022	Young Adult	Fiction	So Many Beginnings: A Little Women Remix	Bethany C. Morrow
2022	Young Adult	Nonfiction	Disability Visibility: First-Person Stories from the Twenty-First Century	Alice Wong
2022	Young Adult	Nonfiction	If I Go Missing	Brianna Jonnie with Nahanni Shingoose and Neal Shannacappo (art)
2022	Young Adult	Nonfiction	Somebody's Daughter	Ashley C. Ford
2023	Early Readers	Fiction	Child of the Flower-Song People: Luz Jiménez, Daughter of the Nahua	Gloria Amescua, Duncan Tonatiuh (art)
2023	Early Readers	Fiction	El cuarto turquesa / The Turquoise Room	Monica Brown, Adriana M. Garcia (art), Cinthya Miranda (translation)
2023	Early Readers	Nonfiction	Yes! No!: A First Conversation About Consent	Megan Madison, Jessica Ralli, and Isabel Roxas (art)
2023	Middle Grade	Fiction	A Seed in the Sun	Aida Salazar
2023	Young Adult	Fiction	Vinyl Moon	Mahogany L. Browne
2023	Young Adult	Fiction	TJ Powar Has Something to Prove	Jesmeen Kaur Deo
2023	Young Adult	Fiction	Confessions of an Alleged Good Girl	Joya Goffney
2023	Young Adult	Fiction	The Billboard	Natalie Y. Moore
2023	Young Adult	Nonfiction	Well, That Was Unexpected	Jesse Q. Sutanto
2023	Young Adult	Nonfiction	Toufah: The Woman Who Inspired an African #MeToo Movement	Toufah Jallow with Kim Pittaway
2024	Early Readers	Fiction	Flower Girl	Amy Bloom, Jameela Wahlgren (art)
2024	Early Readers	Fiction	Big	Vashti Harrison
2024	Early Readers	Fiction	My Powerful Hair	Carole Lindstrom, Steph Littlebird (art)
2024	Early Readers	Nonfiction	Autumn Peltier, Water Warrior	Carole Lindstrom, Bridget George (art)
2024	Middle Grade	Fiction	Barely Floating	Lilliam Rivera
2024	Young Adult	Fiction	Spin	Rebecca Caprara
2024	Young Adult	Fiction	The Blackwoods	Brandy Colbert
2024	Young Adult	Fiction	I Kick and I Fly	Ruchira Gupta
2024	Young Adult	Fiction	The Moonlit Vine	Elizabeth Santiago
2024	Young Adult	Fiction	All the Fighting Parts	Hannah V. Sawyerr
2025	Early Readers	Nonfiction	Ida B. Wells Marches for the Vote	Dinah Johnson, Jerry Jordan (art)
2025	Middle Grade	Fiction	Plain Jane and the Mermaid	Vera Brosgol
2025	Middle Grade	Fiction	The Beautiful Game	Yamile Saied Méndez
2025	Middle Grade	Fiction	Find Her	Ginger Reno
2025	Middle Grade	Nonfiction	The Race to Be Myself: Young Readers Edition	Caster Semenya
2025	Young Adult	Fiction	The Judgment of Yoyo Gold	Isaac Blum
2025	Young Adult	Fiction	Bright Red Fruit	Safia Elhillo
2025	Young Adult	Fiction	Black Girl You Are Atlas	Renée Watson, Ekua Holmes (art)
2025	Young Adult	Fiction	Diary of a Confused Feminist	Kate Weston
2025	Young Adult	Nonfiction	The Unboxing of a Black Girl	Angela Shanté
2026	Early Readers	Fiction	Girls on the Rise	Amanda Gorman
2026	Early Readers	Fiction	Brown Girl, Brown Girl	Leslé Honoré
2026	Early Readers	Nonfiction	The Black Mambas: The World's First All-Woman Anti-Poaching Unit	Kelly Crull
2026	Early Readers	Nonfiction	Up, Up, Ever Up! Junko Tabei: A Life in the Mountains	Anita Yasuda
2026	Middle Grade	Fiction	Ollie In Between	Jess Callans
2026	Young Adult	Fiction	One Step Forward	Marcie Flinchum Atkins
2026	Young Adult	Fiction	Everything is Poison	Joy McCullough
2026	Young Adult	Fiction	Truth Is	Hannah V. Sawyerr
2026	Young Adult	Fiction	The Unexpected Consequence of Bleeding on a Tuesday	Kelsey B. Toney
2026	Young Adult	Nonfiction	Loudmouth: Emma Goldman vs. America (A Love Story)	Deborah Heiligman
