= DJ Vlad =

American YouTuber, founder of VladTV (born 1973)

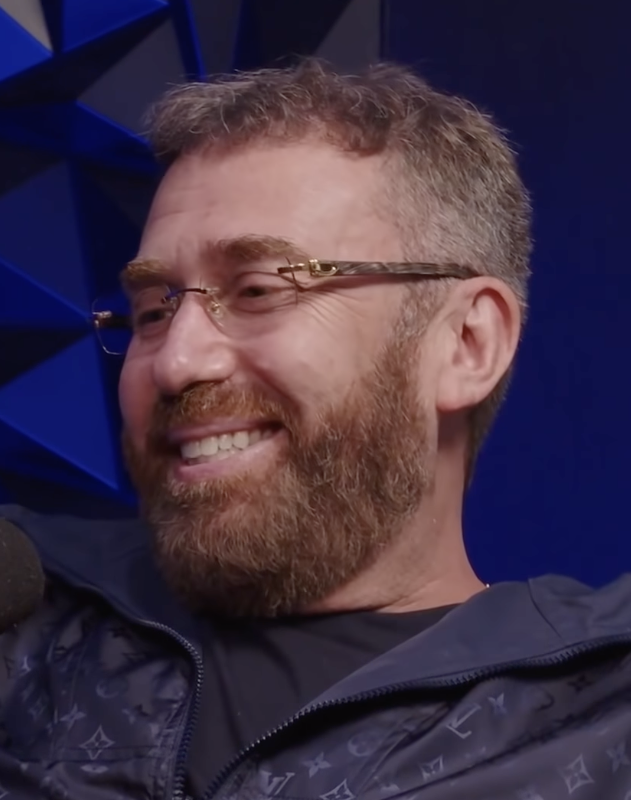
- DJ Vlad in 2022
- Born: Vladislav Lyubovny; 1973 (age 52–53); Kiev, Ukrainian SSR, Soviet Union (now Kyiv, Ukraine)
- Education: University of California, Berkeley (B.S.)
- Occupations: YouTuber; Founder of VladTV
- Years active: 2001-present

YouTube information
- Channel: djvlad
- Years active: 2006–present
- Genres: Entertainment; news; interview
- Subscribers: 6.36 million
- Views: 6.25 billion
- Last updated: 7 April, 2026

DJ Vlad (born Vladislav Lyubovny, (Note: Russian: Владислав Любовный; Ukrainian: Владислав Любовний; Vladyslav Liubovnyi) 1973) is a Ukrainian-American YouTuber, founder of VladTV, and former DJ. VladTV is a YouTube channel and website featuring long-form video content with entertainers, athletes, and other public figures.

== Early life ==
Lyubovny was born in Kyiv, Ukraine (then part of the Soviet Union) to a Russian Jewish family and moved to the United States at the age of five, first living in Springfield, Massachusetts, before his family settled down in San Mateo, California. He grew up in the Bay Area and became interested in hip hop in his youth when N.W.A released their debut album. He went to university at UC Berkeley graduating in Computer Science and Engineering.

== Career ==
Lyubovny was initially making hip hop beats, but later quit from a lack of success. He began DJing after experimenting with a friend's equipment. In a 2010 interview with Parlé Magazine, he stated: "I kinda reached this point where I was like 'I really wanna do music. Let me try and concentrate and do music as well'." He directed on the American Gangster television series, as well as the documentary film Ghostride the Whip.

Lyubovny later launched VladTV.com and initially uploaded MP3 files of DJ mixtapes. He moved to New York City and released the Rap Phenomenon mixtape series. He was also making hip hop DVDs, but was financially struggling as DVD sales began to decline. In 2008, Lyubovny turned his attention towards YouTube, which had recently launched its Partner Program which allows content creators to earn money. Lyubovny then decided to drop all other endeavours and focus on YouTube full-time.

In August 2008, Lyubovny was assaulted by rapper Rick Ross's entourage after he covered a story on the rapper's former career as a corrections officer. Lyubovny filed a $4 million lawsuit. On April 15, 2010, a New York Federal Jury awarded Lyubovny $300,000 in his civil suit, finding Ross liable for setting Lyubovny up for the attack at the 2008 Ozone Awards in Houston, Texas.

In April 2009, the Star & Buc Wild show joined the VladTV family to do a daily feature. In May 2010, Lyubovny voiced himself for a cameo in The Boondocks episode "Bitches to Rags".

In December 2016, Lyubovny interviewed Soulja Boy, who explained events surrounding a home invasion and shooting in 2008. The interview went viral, with many questioning the validity of Soulja Boy's claims. Numerous people parodied Soulja Boy's interview online, including rapper Joe Budden, and comedians Mike Epps and D.C. Young Fly, in what was ironically dubbed the "Soulja Boy Challenge".

In 2026, rapper 6ix9ine stated that Vlad had paid him $50,000 for earlier VladTV appearances and $15,000 for a later interview. Vlad himself said on the podcast The Real Report that he has spent more than one million dollars paying for interviews, a practice that has been described as checkbook journalism.

=== Business Model ===
VladTV is owned by Hot In Here, Inc., a company of which Lyubovny is the owner. Under the platform's Terms of Use, the company retains ownership of all interview footage. Lyubovny has described the arrangement: "When you do Vlad TV, that is my stage that I'm allowing you on. And the reason is because I get final cut of these videos, right? I can cut the video up however I want." He also stated "Either you are an ally or you're content".

Most guests are unpaid, and Lyubovny has stated that payment decisions are based on "the past performance and potential profit of the interview in question." Fees are highly stratified: Tekashi 6ix9ine was paid $50,000 for a single interview, later reduced to $15,000. Boosie Badazz was paid $25,000 per appearance, however when Boosie requested a raise, Lyubovny declined, stating: "I cannot pay you $35K when I'm going to make nothing."

Disputes with former guests have become content for the platform. In September 2026, Aries Spears accused Lyubovny on the Spears & Steinberg podcast of fabricating details of their working relationship; Lyubovny acknowledged adding a disputed detail, stating: "I want to spice it up a little." After Boosie disavowed VladTV, Lyubovny stated: "And honestly, these days, I make more money talking about Boosie than I actually make interviewing Boosie." In a separate dispute with rapper Yung Bleu, HotNewHipHop reported that Lyubovny's disputes had "turned into an opportunity for content," and quoted Bleu declining an interview request: "U def wanted a interview so I can go talk about Boosie cuz yall at odds."

== Political views ==
In 2023, Lyubovny criticized hip hop personalities Drake and DJ Khaled for not speaking on the Palestine-Israel conflict following the October 7 attacks, stating “Has anyone noticed that the most famous Jewish person on Earth, Drake, and the most famous Palestinian person on Earth, DJ Khaled, haven’t said a single thing about the Gaza-Israel conflict? That’s the difference between artists of today and timeless legends like 2Pac. You know damn well Pac would be the first one to speak out about something so close to home.”

== Controversies ==
DJ Vlad has been a controversial figure in the hip‑hop media landscape. His interviewing style, business practices, and public remarks have drawn criticism from artists, comedians, and academics.

=== Accusations of exploitation ===
VladTV has repeatedly been accused of profiting from Black trauma. In a 2021 investigation, The Ringer described Vlad’s interviews as “more like a police interrogation than journalism” and noted that critics label him a “culture vulture” who builds a brand on sensationalizing the pain of Black guests. R&B singer and actor Tyrese Gibson publicly stated that VladTV is “exploitative of Black culture” and urged entertainers to stop appearing on the channel. Rapper Vince Staples declined to be interviewed, stating that Vlad only wanted to discuss “gang banging” rather than music or broader cultural topics.

=== Guest departures and disputes ===
Several recurring guests and interviewees of VladTV publicly severed ties or condemned the platform amid disputes over compensation, editorial integrity, and platform representation.

- In 2023, comedian Mo’Nique and her husband and manager, Sidney Hicks, parted ways from VladTV when Hicks took issue with a contract that would give VladTV the right to keep the interview footage. VladTV hosted the interview without Mo’Nique and Hicks and, in a subsequent episode, DJ Vlad accused Hicks of being a ‘bitch’ for trying to take VladTV’s ‘content.’
- Rapper Boosie Badazz announced in March 2026 that he would no longer appear on VladTV after a pay increase request was denied, later launching his own independent interview series.
- Comedian Aries Spears demanded higher payment for his VladTV appearances, accused Vlad of defamation, threatened legal action, and called him a “culture vulture” in Black spaces. A subsequent A.I.-generated diss track posted by Vlad deepened the feud.
- Rapper Royce da 5'9" publicly criticized Vlad for alleged anti‑Farrakhan remarks, demanded the removal of content, and later called on fans to “eliminate” the platform, referencing past involvement of Juvenile and Young Buck with VladTV.
- Television personality Nick Cannon stated he could no longer work with VladTV after Vlad’s critical comments on Minister Louis Farrakhan.
- Rapper N.O.R.E. demanded that Vlad remove all of his videos from VladTV, distancing himself from the platform.
- Lord Jamar and comedian Godfrey publicly announced they were pulling their support for VladTV.
- Rapper G Herbo vehemently criticized Vlad after an interview, saying Vlad “prioritizes views over integrity” and vowing never to return to the platform.

=== Dispute with Morgan Jerkins ===
In 2024, Lyubovny engaged in a public dispute on X with Princeton University professor Morgan Jerkins. After Jerkins criticized Lyubovny's perspectives on the song "Not Like Us," Lyubovny tagged her employer on social media and suggested that Jerkins should be terminated. After backlash, Lyubovny later claimed the incident was "trolling" intended to spark a conversation on race, a claim professor Jerkins denied.

=== Joyner Lucas copyright lawsuit ===
Vlad filed a federal lawsuit against rapper Joyner Lucas in November 2025, for alleged copyright violations. Vlad, through Hot in Here, Inc., stated that Lucas posted a video of Aries Spears's interview on VladTV to Lucas’s X account. The video, which Lucas posted during Spears’s public 2025 feud with U.K. rapper Skepta, shows Spears mocking U.K. rappers by imitating their accents. Vlad stated that Lucas edited out the VladTV watermark and failed to credit VladTV, potentially losing VladTV advertising revenue. Vlad requested around $150,000 for legal fees, and an injunction. He also requested an accounting of the profits Lucas made from posting the video.

Prior to filing the lawsuit, Vlad communicated with Lucas’s manager to settle the case. Vlad offered to withdraw the case if Lucas allowed Vlad to edit and license the video, or if Lucas agreed to be interviewed by VladTV. The negotiations failed after Lucas sent a text message rejecting both options and dared Vlad to take legal action. Lucas subsequently released screenshots of the exchange on social media, accusing Vlad of extortion.

In response, Vlad denied any wrongdoing, insisting the lawsuit was strictly about protecting his intellectual property. He called Lucas and his manager "not very smart" and suggested Lucas was "clout-chasing" by publicizing the dispute instead of resolving it privately. Lucas, meanwhile, publicly maintained that Vlad had been "stalking" him for years to appear on his channel and that the suit was retaliation for his refusal.
