= The Proudest Blue =

2019 children's book by Ibtihaj Muhammad and S. K. Ali

The Proudest Blue: A Story of Hijab and Family
- Cover
- Author: Ibtihaj Muhammad and S.K. Ali
- Illustrator: Hatem Aly
- Language: English
- Genre: Children's literature, Picture book
- Publisher: Little, Brown Books for Young Readers
- Publication date: September 10, 2019
- Publication place: United States
- Media type: Print (hardcover, paperback), Audio
- Pages: 36
- ISBN: 978-0-31-651900-7

The Proudest Blue: A Story of Hijab and Family is a children's picture book written by Olympic medalist and social justice activist Ibtihaj Muhammad and S.K. Ali, illustrated by Hatem Aly, and published September 10, 2019 by Little, Brown Books for Young Readers. The book is a New York Times best seller.

The book was inspired by Muhammad's experiences wearing a hijab.

== Summary ==
The Proudest Blue: A Story of Hijab and Family follows sisters Asiya and Faizah. Asiya is celebrating her first day of wearing a hijab. Although most kids in their class are struggling to understand, Faizah and Asiya are proud of what the hijab represents in their Muslim faith and culture.

Faizah spends most of the book worrying for her sister. When students make unkind comments about Asiya's hijab, Faizah is shocked to see her turn away from the bullies and drop their hurtful words. At the end of the book, Faizah learns the bullies do not upset Asiya. She watches her sister continue to wear her hijab with pride. She follows her sister’s examples and ignores the bullies. As the sisters head home, Faizah can’t wait to wear her own blue first-day hijab.

== Reception ==
The Proudest Blue received starred reviews from Kirkus, Publishers Weekly, School Library Journal, and Booklist, as well as a positive review from The New York Times.

The book also received the following accolades:

- Goodreads Choice Award for Picture Books nominee (2019)
- Booklist Editors' Choice: Books for Youth (2019)
- Rise: A Feminist Book Project top ten (2020)
- ALSC's Notable Children's Books (2020)
