= S.K. Ali =

Canadian children's book author

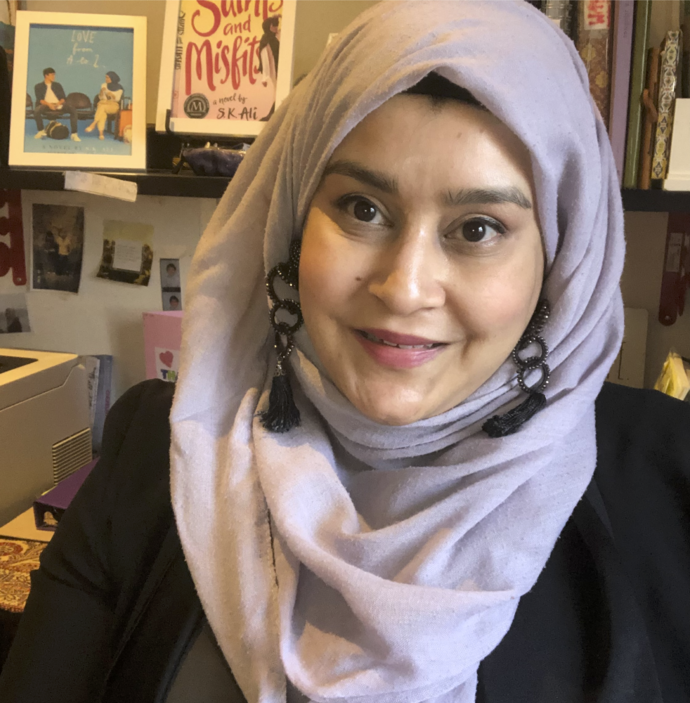
- Born: India
- Education: York University
- Writing career
- Language: English
- Years active: 2017-now
- Genres: Young adult fiction; Middle grade fiction
- Notable works: Saint and Misfits
- Notable awards: Asian/Pacific American Award for Young Adult Literature (2017)
- Website: skalibooks.com

Sajidah "S.K." Ali is a Canadian author. She is best known debut young adult novel Saints & Misfits, about Janna Yousuf, an Indian-American hijabi who grapples with being sexually assaulted by a friend's cousin from her local mosque.

Ali was born in South India and immigrated to Canada when she was three. The first language she learned in school was French. She wrote her first story in seventh grade.

She has a degree in Creative Writing from York University. Aside from writing, Ali also works as a teacher and has written articles for the Toronto Star. She mentions Judy Blume as one of her biggest inspirations for her writing career. Ali is a practicing Muslim. In January 2017, she created the hashtag #MuslimShelfSpace as a way to shine light on books by other Muslim authors.

She lives with her family in Toronto.

Ali is friends with fellow writers Ausma Zehanat Khan and Uzma Jalaluddin. The three of them hold an informal writing circle with each other, sharing career advice and comments on early drafts of their work.

== Awards ==
Several of Ali's works have received commendations. Saints & Misfits was included on Booklist's 2017 "Top 10 Religion & Spirituality Books for Youth" and 2018 "Top 10 Diverse Fiction for Older and Middle Readers" lists. The same year, the American Library Association included it on their lists of the Best Fiction for Young Adults and Rise: A Feminist Book Project.

The Proudest Blue was also included on Booklist's "Top 10 Religion & Spirituality for Youth" list, as well as their 2019 Booklist Editors' Choice list of best books for youth. The following year, the Association for Library Service to Children named it among the year's Notable Children's Books (2020), and the American Library Association included it as a top-ten selection for the Rise: A Feminist Book Project.

Also in 2019, Shelf Awareness named Love from A to Z one of the best young adult books of 2019. The following year, the American Library Association included it on their list of Best Fiction for Young Adults and their Rise: A Feminist Book Project list.

In 2021, the Association for Library Service to Children included Once Upon an Eid on their annual list of Notable Children's Books.

Awards for Ali's works
Year	Work	Award	Result	Ref.
2017	Saints and Misfits	Asian/Pacific American Award for Young Adult Literature	Honor	
2018	Saints and Misfits	William C. Morris Award	Finalist	
2019	Love from A to Z	Goodreads Choice Award for Young Adult	Finalist	
2019	The Proudest Blue	Goodreads Choice Award for Picture Books	Nominee	
2020	Love from A to Z	Amy Mathers Teen Book Award	Finalist	
2020	The Proudest Blue	Charlotte Huck Award	Nominee	
2021	The Proudest Blue	Blue Spruce Award	Finalist	
2022	Misfit in Love	Amy Mathers Teen Book Award	Finalist	
2024	Grounded	Walter Dean Myers Award for Younger Readers	Honor	
2024	The Kindest Red	Blue Spruce Award	Finalist	
2025	Fledgling	Amy Mathers Teen Book Award	Finalist	
2025	Fledgling	Arlene Barlin Award for Science Fiction and Fantasy	Finalist	
2025	Fledgling	Ruth & Sylvia Schwartz Children's Book Award	Finalist	

== Works ==
=== Novels ===
- Saeed, Aisha; Al-Marashi, Huda; Thompkins-Bigelow, Jamilah; Ali, S.K. (2023). Grounded. Harry N. Abrams. ISBN 9781419761751.

==== The Keeper's Records of Revolution ====
- Ali, S. K. (2024). Fledgling. Kokila. ISBN 9780593531242.
- Ali, S. K. (2026). Golden Flight. Kokila. ISBN 9780593531273.

==== Love from A to Z ====
- Ali, S. K. (2019). Love from A to Z. Salaam Reads. ISBN 9781534442726.
- Ali, S. K. (2021). The Eid Gift: An Adam and Zayneb Story. Simon & Schuster. ISBN 9781534492028.
- Ali, S. K. (2022). Love From Mecca to Medina. Salaam Reads. ISBN 9781665916073.

==== Saints & Misfits ====
- Ali, S. K. (2017). Saints & Misfits. Salaam Reads. ISBN 9781481499248.
- Ali, S. K. (2021). Misfit in Love. Salaam Reads. ISBN 9781534442757.

=== Picture books ===
- Muhammad, Ibtihaj; Ali, S. K. (2019). The Proudest Blue. Illustrated by Hatem Aly. Little, Brown Books for Young Readers. ISBN 9780316519007.
- Muhammad, Ibtihaj; Ali, S. K. (2023). The Kindest Red. Illustrated by Hatem Aly. Little, Brown Books for Young Readers. ISBN 9780759555709.
- Muhammad, Ibtihaj; Ali, S. K. (2024). The Boldest White. Illustrated by Hatem Aly. Little, Brown Books for Young Readers. ISBN 9780759555716.

=== Collections ===
- Ali, S. K. (2019). "A Bountiful Film". In Chapman, Elise; Richmond, Caroline Tung (eds.). Hungry Hearts: 13 Tales of Food & Love. Simon Pulse. pp. 276–310. ISBN 9781534421851.
- Ali, S. K.; Saeed, Aisha, eds. (2020). Once Upon an Eid: Stories of Hope of Joy by 15 Muslim Voices. Amulet Books. ISBN 9781419740831.
- Ali, S. K. (2023). "The True Story Behind Ketchup Pizza". In Hohn, Nadia L. (ed.). The Antiracist Kitchen: 21 Stories. Illustrated by Roza Nozari. Orca Book Publishers. pp. 276–310. ISBN 9781459833432.
