= With the Fire on High =

2019 young adult novel by Elizabeth Acevedo

- First edition (publ. Quill Tree Books)
- Author: Elizabeth Acevedo
- Audio read by: Elizabeth Acevedo
- Genre: Young adult fiction
- Set in: Philadelphia and Spain
- Publisher: Quill Tree Books
- Publication date: May 7th 2019
- ISBN: 978-0-06-266285-9

With the Fire on High is a young adult novel by Elizabeth Acevedo, published May 7, 2019 by Quill Tree Books, an imprint of HarperCollins. It follows Emoni, a high school senior who must manage caring for her daughter and embrace her passion for cooking when she enrolls in her school's new culinary class.

== Reception ==
The book received starred reviews from Booklist, School Library Journal, The Horn Book, and Publishers Weekly, as well as positive reviews from Kirkus, The Washington Post, The New York Times, NPR, and Entertainment Weekly.

Publishers Weekly, School Library Journal, The Horn Book, Chicago Public Library, and NPR named it one of the best books of the year.

With the Fire on High Book Awards
Year	Award	Result
2020	YALSA's Best Fiction for Young Adults	Top Ten
2020	YALSA's Teens' Top Ten	Top Ten
2020	YALSA's Quick Picks for Reluctant Young Adult Readers	Selection
2020	Rise: A Feminist Book Project	Selection
2020	Walter Dean Myers Award for Teen	Honor Book
2020	Notable Books for a Global Society	Winner
2020	Amelia Elizabeth Walden Award	Finalist
2020	Golden Kite Award for Young Adult Fiction	Honor Book
2019	Goodreads Choice Award for Young Adult Fiction	Nominee

The audiobook received a starred review from Booklist.

With the Fire on High Audiobook Awards
Year	Award	Result
2020	Audie Award for Narration by the Author or Authors	Winner
2020	Audie Award for Young Adult	Finalist
2020	YALSA's Amazing Audiobooks for Young Adults	Top Ten
	Junior Library Guild	Selection
