= Tomboy: A Graphic Memoir =

2014 autobiographical graphic novel by Liz Prince

- Cover of Tomboy: A Graphic Memoir
- Author: Liz Prince
- Language: English
- Genre: Memoir, Graphic novel
- Publisher: Zest Books
- Publication date: September 2nd 2014
- Publication place: United States
- Media type: Print (hardcover, paperback), Audiobook
- ISBN: 978-1-93-697655-3

Tomboy: A Graphic Memoir is an autobiographical graphic novel by Liz Prince, published September 2, 2014 by Zest Books.

== Reception ==
Tomboy received a starred review from Kirkus, as well as positive reviews from Publishers Weekly, Broken Frontier, Booklist, and The Masters Review.

Kirkus named it one of the best books of the year.

Awards for Tomboy
Year	Award	Result
2014	Goodreads Choice Award for Graphic Novels & Comics	Nominee
2015	ALA Amelia Bloomer Book List	Top 10
2015	ALA Rainbow Book List	Selection
2015	Independent Publisher Book Award (IPPY) for Graphic Novel/Drawn Book - Drama/Documentary	Gold
2015	Texas Library Association's Maverick Graphic Novel List	Selection
2015	YALSA Award for Excellence in Nonfiction for Young Adults	Longlisted
2015	YALSA Great Graphic Novels for Teens	Nominee
2015	YALSA Quick Picks for Reluctant Teens	Top 10
