= Catalyst (novel) =

2002 novel by Laurie Halse Anderson

- First edition cover
- Author: Laurie Halse Anderson
- Cover artist: Michael Morgenstern
- Language: English
- Genre: Young adult novel
- Publisher: Viking Press
- Publication date: September 2002
- Publication place: United States
- Media type: Print (hardback & paperback)
- Pages: 233 pp (first edition, hardback)
- ISBN: 0-670-03566-1 (first edition, hardback)
- OCLC: 49821813
- LC Class: PZ7.A54385 Cat 2002
- Preceded by: Speak

Catalyst is a 2002 novel by American writer Laurie Halse Anderson, published September 2002 by Viking Press.

The book tells the story of Kate Malone, a preacher's daughter and high school student who is excellent in chemistry and aspires to attend the Massachusetts Institute of Technology (MIT), but faces multiple tragic circumstances, ranging from rejection by MIT, to her neighbor Teri Litch's house burning down at the end of her senior year. The book is set in the same fictional setting as Anderson's previous novel Speak.

== Reception ==
Catalyst received positive reviews from The Book Report, Publishers Weekly, Booklist, and Kirkus. Teenreads.com put Catalyst on its Ultimate Teen Reading List.

The book also received the following accolades:

- American Library Association (ALA) Best Books for Young Adults Top Ten (2003)
- ALA Selected Audiobooks for Young Adults (2007)
