= Wintergirls =

Book by Laurie Halse Anderson

- Author: Laurie Halse Anderson
- Language: English
- Genre: Realistic Fiction
- Publisher: Viking
- Publication date: 2009
- Publication place: United States
- Media type: Hardback and paperback
- Pages: 278 pp (first edition, hardback)
- ISBN: 978-0-670-01110-0 (first edition, hardback)
- OCLC: 255902817
- LC Class: PZ7.85 Wi 2009

Wintergirls (2009) is a realistic fiction novel by the American author Laurie Halse Anderson. The novel was published in 2009 by Viking. The story focuses on a girl, Lia Overbrook, who has anorexia and self-harms. Lia struggles to cope with her mental illness while balancing everything else going on in her life. Some months after a fall out with her best friend Cassie, Lia receives the news that she has died from bulimia. This complicates Lia's life even more and forces her to confront her own illness.

== Plot ==
Lia Overbrook, an 18-year-old girl, finds out that her ex-best friend Cassie has been found dead in a motel room. Cassie had called Lia 33 times the Saturday night and early Sunday morning of her death. However, Lia never answered the phone. Cassie was killed by her illness, bulimia, an overdose on sleeping pills mixed with alcohol, and in particular, from Boerhaave's Syndrome. Lia, who has a history of anorexia and triggered from Cassie's death, falls into a downward spiral of self-harm and calorie counting. Hiding her illness from her family, Lia's obsessive and destructive behavior worsens and recovery seems impossible. Soon, Cassie's ghost starts haunting Lia. This makes Lia feel guilty for not picking up the phone that night and not being there for Cassie when she needed it most. In one such haunting, Cassie swallows her "see-glass."

Lia's relationship with her step-mother, Jennifer, is complicated. While Jennifer is not directly responsible for her parents' divorce, she married Lia's father quickly after it had happened. The relationship between Lia and her mother - often referred to as either mom or Dr. Marrigan - is tense as well. Lia's mom maintains high expectations for her and is adamant about a strict recover regiment. However, Lia's father believes that she deserves more freedom so as to not push her too hard. Jennifer's nine-year-old daughter and Lia's step-sister, Emma, is one of the only few things that keeps her feeling happy. Lia has been struggling with eating disorders for quite some time and none of the help she received has made much of a difference. It wasn't until being in a car accident with Cassie that Lia's anorexia was discovered. Lia finds it difficult to get close to her family because of multiple hospitalizations to New Season and fights over her recovery treatment.

Lia meets Elijah after visiting the motel room Cassie died in. Elijah attends Cassie's funeral with Lia and the two form a close bond. As Lia continues to reflect on her and Cassie's history with their respective eating disorders, her self-harm becomes increasingly worse and Cassie's haunting becomes more aggressive. Multiple attempts to help her recover fail. After a suicide attempt, all three parents agree to move Lia back in with her mother for an intensive recovery plan.

In an act of desperation, Lia goes to the motel room to run away with Elijah. After she falls asleep, Lia wakes up to Elijah gone and a note left behind. He apologizes for leaving her behind, believing that she needs more help than running away from her issues. As Lia sits in the motel room, she accidentally overdoses on sleeping pills in an attempt to finally get some rest. She wakes up, walks around the motel, and sees the door to the room Cassie died in open. Cassie tries to take Lia to the afterlife with her and a fight ensues. Lia tricks Cassie in order to grab the "see-glass" and sees multiple futures she could live. Cassie admits to jealousy as Lia has a choice to either continue living or die with her. Seeing a way out, Lia tells Cassie to think of all the good things in her life before she died. While reminiscing, Cassie tells Lia about the working payphone and quarters in the desk to call for help. Both apologize to each other and make their peace. Lia finally calls.

Lia has become a patient at New Seasons once more. This time she works through her issues with her family and her overall recovery seriously. Lia has high hopes for the future, stating that she is thawing.

== Awards and nominations ==
Wintergirls was a New York Times bestseller and ALA best book for young adults. In 2009, the novel received the Kirkus Reviews best YA book. While in 2010 Wintergirls made the YALSA list, as well as received recognition from the Chicago Tribune as one of the top ten influential books of the decade. Wintergirls also won the 2010 Milwaukee County Teen Book Award.

== Reception ==
Wintergirls received mostly positive reviews from critics. Writing for The Guardian, Melvin Burgess notes that the novel is "an exhausting novel to read: brilliant, intoxication, full of drama, love, and like all the best books of this kind, hope." Burgess further notes, "It would be rare to find a novel in mainstream adult fiction prepared to pull out the dramatic stops this far, and difficult to imagine one in recent years that was prepared to be so bold stylistically." The Washington Post described the book as "both painful to read and riveting". The New York Times said that "We recognize Lia, but it's sometimes hard to relate to her." Common Sense Media rated the novel five stars, noting that the novel's writing style is innovative and that Lia's references to fairy tale imagery makes it appealing to young adult female readers. However, some critics have expressed concerned that Wintergirls could serve as a "trigger" novel, encouraging eating disorders in young girls rather than dissuading them. Jezebel observes that "read without supervision or discussion [for vulnerable teens] Wintergirls could indeed be triggering. But if read as part of a conversation...perhaps it could make a teen's world a little less dark."
