= Twisted (Anderson novel) =

2007 young adult novel by Laurie Halse Anderson

- Author: Laurie Halse Anderson
- Language: English
- Genre: Young adult novel
- Publisher: Viking Press
- Publication date: May 15, 2008
- Publication place: United States
- ISBN: 9780142411841

Twisted is a young adult novel by Laurie Halse Anderson published March 20, 2007 by Viking Books.

== Reception ==
=== Reviews ===
Twisted was generally well-received by critics, including a starred review from Kirkus Reviews.

Publishers Weekly wrote, "This dark comedy gives a chillingly accurate portrayal of the high-school social scene, in which morals, perceptions and conceptions of truth are continually being challenged." They further indicated that "readers will respect [the main character's] integrity, which outshines his mistakes."

=== Awards ===
Year	Award	Result	Ref.
2008	American Library Association's (ALA) Best Books for Young Adults	Selection	
2012	ALA Popular Paperbacks for Young Adults	Selection	

=== Controversy ===
Twisted is listed on the American Library Association's (ALA) "Frequently Challenged Young Adult Books" list. The list is created via ALA Office for Intellectual Freedom, which "receives reports from libraries, schools, and the media on attempts to ban books in communities across the country," then "compile[s] lists of challenged books in order to inform the public about censorship efforts that affect libraries and schools."

In 2022, Twisted was listed among 52 novels banned by the Alpine School District following the implementation of Utah law H.B. 374, “Sensitive Materials In Schools."
