= Hannah V. Sawyerr =

American poet and novelist

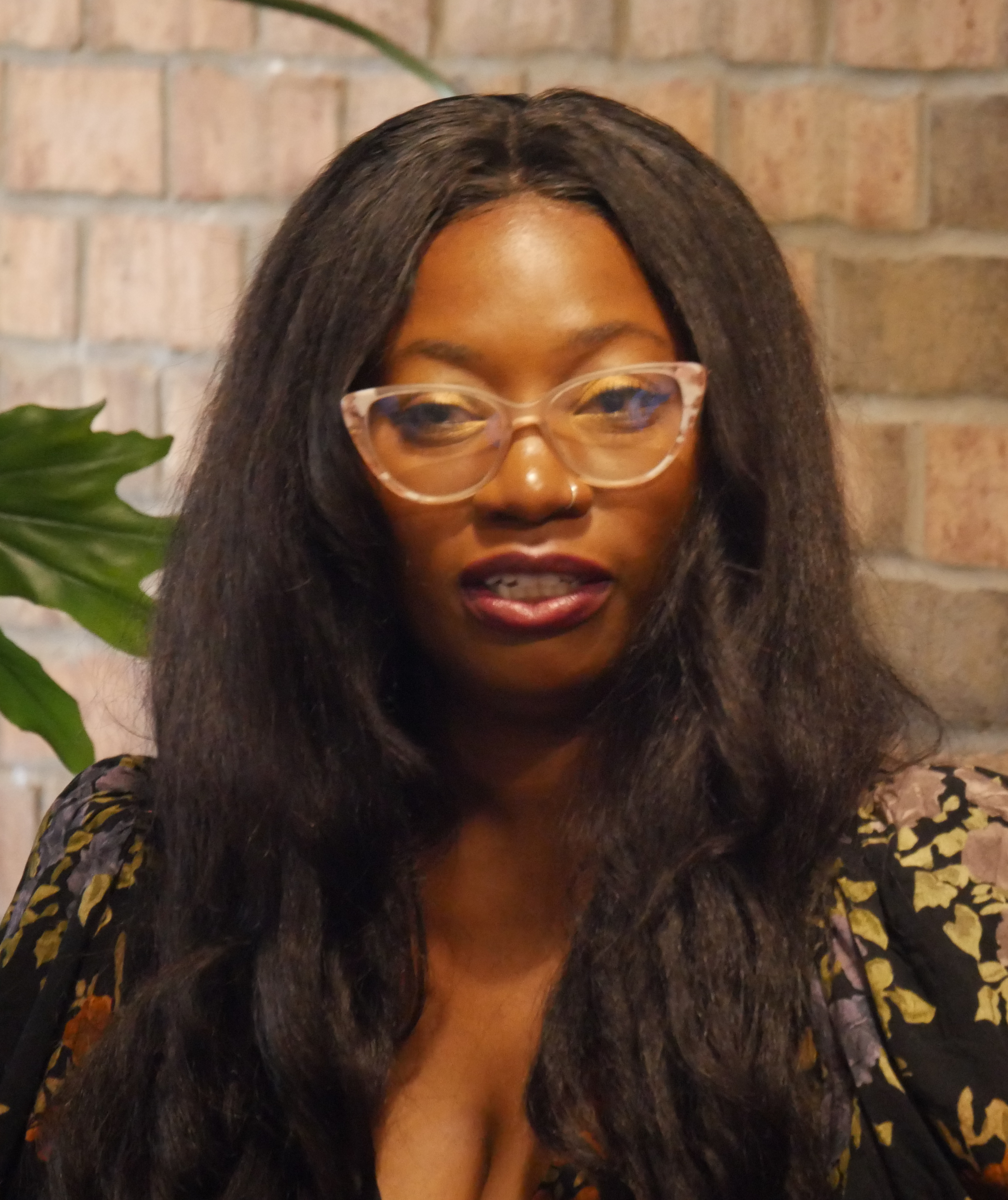
- Education: Morgan State University
- Occupations: poet; novelist
- Writing career
- Language: English
- Genre: Young-adult fiction

Hannah V. Sawyerr is a Sierra Leonean-American poet and young adult novelist. Her books include All the Fighting Parts (2023) and Truth Is (2025).

She received a Bachelor of Arts in English from Morgan State University, followed by a Master of Fine Arts in creative writing from The New School. As of 2023, Sawyerr taught English at Loyola Marymount University and lived in Los Angeles, California.

== Recognition ==
In 2016, Sawyerr was named the Youth Poet Laureate of Baltimore. She received a national medal at the NAACP Afro-Academic, Cultural, Technological and Scientific Olympics for her poem "For Girls Growing Into Their Hips". Her poems have been featured on the BBC's World Have Your Say and in the National Education Association's "Do You Hear Us?" campaign.

All the Fighting Parts and Truth Is were well received by critics. In 2023, All the Fighting Parts was a finalist for the Cybils Award for Poetry. The novel's audiobook, narrated by the author, was named one of the best young adult audiobooks of 2023 by Kirkus Reviews. The following year, the novel was named a Walter Dean Myers Award honor book and was a finalist for the William C. Morris Award. The American Library Association included it as a top ten pick for their Rise: A Feminist Book Project. The Young Adult Library Services Association included it on their 2024 list of Quick Picks for Reluctant Young Adult Readers, as well as their 2025 list of Best Fiction for Young Adults.

Truth Is is a Junior Library Guild book. In 2025, it was a finalist for the National Book Award for Young People's Literature, as well as the Los Angeles Times Book Prize for Young Adult Novel. The American Library Association named it a top ten pick for the 2026 Rise: A Feminist Book Project.

Book Riot, Kirkus Reviews and Publishers Weekly named it one of the best young adult books of the year.

== Books ==
- All the Fighting Parts. Abrams. 2023. ISBN 978-1-419-76261-1.
- Truth Is. Amulet. 2025. ISBN 978-1-4197-7683-0.
