= Speak (2004 film) =

2004 American independent coming-of-age teen drama

- Promotional release poster
- Directed by: Jessica Sharzer
- Written by: Jessica Sharzer; Annie Young Frisbie
- Based on: Speak by Laurie Halse Anderson
- Produced by: Fred Berner; Matthew Myers; Annie Young Frisbie; Jessica Sharzer
- Starring: Kristen Stewart; Michael Angarano; Robert John Burke; Eric Lively; Elizabeth Perkins; D. B. Sweeney; Steve Zahn
- Cinematography: Andrij Parekh
- Edited by: Peter C. Frank
- Music by: Christopher Libertino
- Distributed by: Showtime Networks Inc.
- Release date: January 20, 2004 (Sundance)
- Running time: 92 minutes
- Country: United States
- Language: English
- Budget: $1 million

Speak is a 2004 American coming-of-age teen drama film written and directed by Jessica Sharzer in her feature directorial debut, based on the 1999 novel of the same name by Laurie Halse Anderson. Starring Kristen Stewart, Michael Angarano, Robert John Burke, Eric Lively, Elizabeth Perkins, D. B. Sweeney, and Steve Zahn, the film follows Melinda Sordino (Stewart), a high school freshman who stops talking after senior student Andy Evans (Lively) rapes her at a party.

Speak premiered out of competition at the 2004 Sundance Film Festival on January 20, 2004, and was broadcast on Showtime and Lifetime on September 5, 2005. The film received critical acclaim, with particular praise for Stewart's performance.

== Plot ==
14-year-old Melinda Sordino begins her first year in high school and struggles on the first day. She has no friends, and appears uncomfortable when speaking to others. On the bus to school, she meets Heather, whom she somewhat befriends. Throughout the day, she is made fun of by several students, repeatedly called a "squealer". It's revealed that Melinda called the police to a house party during the previous summer. However, her reason for doing so was because she was raped at the party, by popular senior student Andy Evans, but her trauma prevented her from reporting her assault over the telephone or to the police when they arrived.

Melinda’s poor grades on her recent report card prompt her parents to order that she meets with history teacher Mr. Neck, to review options for improving her current grade. In response, she is assigned an essay on a history topic of her choice relating to the turn of the 20th century, to which she chooses the suffragette movement. After refusing to read her paper aloud to her class, Melinda is sent to the principal's office, where a meeting occurs with her parents. Despite seemingly befriending Melinda, Heather soon abandons her when the chance for social advancement arises. The only other student with whom Melinda gets along with is her lab partner, Dave Petrakis, who has successfully managed to avoid affiliating himself with a clique.

Over the year, the restoration of Melinda's confidence progresses at a slow rate, with some help from Dave and her art teacher, Mr. Freeman. When her former best friend, Rachel Bruin, starts dating Andy, Melinda fears that Rachel will be assaulted as well. Melinda meets Rachel at the library and reveals, by writing it on a piece of paper, that Andy raped her. Rachel initially refuses to believe Melinda, thinking that Melinda is lying out of jealousy. However, Rachel soon realizes the truth when confronting Andy; who mentions Melinda's name, despite supposedly never meeting any of Rachel's friends before. Seeing Andy's lies and misogyny, Rachel leaves him and spreads the truth of Melinda's assault to the other students.

Exposed as a rapist and a liar, an enraged Andy soon corners and threatens Melinda in a custodian closet. Andy demands Melinda take back her accusation, but Melinda overpowers him, blinding him with turpentine and holding a shard of glass from a broken mirror to his neck, threatening to kill him. They are found by Melinda's distant friend Nicole, as well as other girls from her field hockey team, and the altercation removes any doubt about what happened at the house party. The girls help restrain a now-helpless Andy, as Melinda leaves. Mr. Neck sees Melinda walking away from the scene and asks what was going on, but Melinda doesn't respond.

On the way back from the hospital after being treated for her injuries, Melinda rolls down the car window and breathes in deeply. She finally finds the strength to tell her mother, who already suspects something awful, the truth about what happened at the party.

== Cast ==
- Kristen Stewart as Melinda Sordino
- Michael Angarano as David Petrakis
- Robert John Burke as Mr. Neck
- Hallee Hirsh as Rachel Bruin
- Eric Lively as Andy Evans (IT)
- Elizabeth Perkins as Joyce Sordino
- D. B. Sweeney as Jack Sordino
- Steve Zahn as Mr. Freeman
- Allison Siko as Heather Billings
- Leslie Lyles as Hairwoman
- Tyanna Rolley as Nicole
- Laurie Halse Anderson as lunch lady (cameo)

== Production ==
=== Development and Pre-production ===
Producer and screenwriter Annie Young Frisbie read the novel and successfully made a bid to get the rights to a film version. Production took place in Columbus, Ohio because a production partner, Matthew Myers, was relocating there with his wife.

=== Filming ===
Film production took 21 days in August 2003, on a budget of $1 million. Flooding during an especially heavy summer rain caused filming to be temporarily postponed and during that time author Laurie Halse Anderson visited the set with her daughter. Anderson cameos in the film as the lunch lady who gives Melinda the mashed potatoes.

The school scenes for the movie were shot at Eastmoor Academy on the east side of Columbus.

== Release ==
The film premiered at the 2004 Sundance Film Festival and played the film festival circuit, including the Woodstock Film Festival. It later aired simultaneously on the cable networks Showtime and Lifetime on September 5, 2005.

=== Reception ===
On the review aggregator website Rotten Tomatoes, 80% of 5 critics' reviews are positive, with an average rating of 8/10.

Marilyn Moss of The Hollywood Reporter gave an overwhelmingly positive write-up, describing the film as, "well-made and extremely touching." She praised Stewart's performance, saying she gave an "understated performance that will touch everyone who sees [the film]." Moss also praised the score and editing, saying it "merges [Stewart's] character's interior and exterior worlds beautifully." On his YouTube channel, critic Chris Stuckmann gave the film a retrospective positive review, praising Stewart and Zahn's performances, the cinematography, and direction. Stuckmann also said the film feels "at home" for him, because of the filming that took place in Ohio (Stuckmann's home state). Barbara Shulgasser-Parker of Common Sense Media gave the film a rating of four out of five stars, and called it, "a startlingly good film on what has become a familiar subject in both fiction and life." She praised Stewart's performance and the direction. Although Neil Genzlinger of The New York Times opined the film "comes nowhere near capturing the wise, subtle tone of the book it's based on", "[it] is still an effective treatment of a difficult subject, thanks almost entirely to the performance of Kristen Stewart as the young victim."

Christopher Null of ContactMusic.com gave the film a rating of three out of five stars, saying it "is decent, even pretty good at times, but ultimately this material feels so familiar that we see every turn in the story telegraphed from miles away." Dennis Harvey of Variety called the production values "OK," but said, "Eventual coming-to-terms (plus the culprit’s public humiliation) would’ve been much more potent with less caricatured adult characters and more nuanced direction."

=== Accolades ===
In 2006, the film was nominated for a Writers Guild Award. Jessica Sharzer was also nominated for a Directors Guild Award in the category of Outstanding Directorial Achievement in Children's Programs.

== Home media ==
The film was released on DVD in Australia by Flashback Entertainment (Cat 16980).

== Bibliography ==
- Glenn, Wendy J. (2009). Laurie Halse Anderson: Speaking in Tongues (36th ed.). Scarecrow Press. ISBN 978-0-81-087281-3.
