= Chains (novel) =

2008 novel by Laurie Halse Anderson

- Author: Laurie Halse Anderson
- Cover artist: Christopher Silas Neal (illustrator); Lizzy Bromley & Jessica Handelman (design)
- Language: English
- Series: Seeds of America
- Genre: Historical fiction
- Published: October 2008 Simon & Schuster, Atheneum
- Publication place: United States
- Media type: Hardcover & Paperback
- Pages: 316
- ISBN: 978-1-4169-0585-1
- Followed by: Forge (2010) and Ashes (2016)

Chains, written by Laurie Halse Anderson, is the first in the Seeds of America trilogy of young-adult historical novels, published in the United States on October 21, 2008. The story follows Isabel, a teenaged African-American slave striving for her and her younger sister, Ruth’s,freedom during the American Revolutionary War. Chains takes place mainly in New York City in 1776 into 1777, at a time when slavery was legal and common in the Thirteen Colonies. The book is followed by sequels Forge (2010) and Ashes (2016).

Though the novel is fictional, elements of the story relate to the actual early stages of the war, such as the failed plan for George Washington's assassination and the hanging of one of the conspirators, the capture of Fort Washington, and the popular pamphlet Common Sense by Thomas Paine.

== Synopsis ==
In the first year of the Revolutionary War, Isabel, along with her younger sister Ruth, both slaves, look forward to freedom as promised in the will of their now-deceased owner. Unfortunately, their owner's nephew disbelieves Isabel is literate and refuses to seek out the will, instead selling them to an abusive couple, the Locktons. The Locktons bring the sisters to New York City from their previous hometown of Newport. Isabel soon meets another slave named Curzon, who asks her to spy on the couple, whom she soon realizes are secretly Loyalists. Curzon wishes to report the Locktons' potentially suspicious plans to his own master, a Patriot. Determined to gain her own liberty, as well as Ruth's, Isabel agrees to spy on her new masters.

Isabel overhears that Master Lockton is involved in a plot to bribe Patriots to defect, and she tells Curzon. Patriot soldiers soon search the house and arrest Lockton, releasing him the following day and leading to much domestic chaos in the home. Isabel also overhears Lockton plotting with the New York mayor to assassinate General George Washington. While Ruth undergoes an epileptic seizure, Isabel runs to the local Patriot fort and exposes the conspiracy. Wanted again by the Patriots, Lockton escapes the city by hiding inside a cheese crate, leaving his wife in charge of the house.

When the British fleet enters New York Harbor, the Patriots topple a statue of the British king and formally declare independence. Isabel wakes one morning to find that Ruth has been sold to the West Indies. Furious, she confronts Madam Lockton, who attacks her. Isabel runs out to the Patriot fort, but its colonel tells Isabel he cannot help her; she is then imprisoned for violating her owner and viciously branded with an "I" on her cheek for "insolence", taking six days to recover from the excruciating punishment. Curzon encourages Isabel to keep spying, but she ignores him, eventually learning at a gathering of slaves that the British are offering freedom to slaves that join their cause.

The British enjoy a major victory at the Battle of Long Island, and Master Lockton returns home along with the occupying British forces. A few soldiers begin living inside the Lockton house. Isabel is sent across town to tend on Lockton's sickly but kind aunt, Lady Seymour, when a fire breaks out across much of New York City. Isabel and Lady Seymour barely manage their way back to the Lockton home, where many more British soldiers and their wives are soon housed. Isabel worries about Curzon, whom she discovers was taken by the British as a prisoner of war. She visits him in Bridewell Prison by bribing the guard with food. In-between visits, a bookstore owner gives her Common Sense, which she reads. She continues tending to Lady Seymour and visiting the Patriot prisoners, occasionally sharing military secrets.

Eventually, Madam Lockton finds out about Isabel's activities and strikes her; trapping Isabel, she reveals that Ruth has not actually been sold yet, and is being held in Charleston, South Carolina. Isabel escapes, grabbing a map and filling out a pass to declare herself a freedwoman. She returns to Bridewell to liberate Curzon, where she finds him extremely weak. She falsely announces he is dead, and sneaks him out of the prison in a wheelbarrow. Stealing a rowboat, they cross the New Jersey border, where she asks Curzon if he is ready to begin the long journey on foot to Charleston.

== Major characters ==
=== Isabel ===
The protagonist and narrator of the novel, is always striving her best to do anything she can do to get her and her sister out of slavery and back to Rhode Island, where they belong. Isabel's ultimate goal is to find the lawyer who wrote Miss Mary Finch's last will and to set her and her sister free from slavery. Though at a very young age—thirteen years old—she has a very tough character and is devoted to anything she does. Her cleverness helps her in her various tasks of spying on the Loyalists and planning her escape. She is very nurturing towards her younger sister Ruth, knowing that she is the only person who can truly take care of her. She befriends a slave boy named Curzon who works for a Patriot, Master Bellingham, to whom she is a good friend he can always trust, which is shown when she desperately tries to deliver leftover food to Curzon, who is in prison; considering she knows the consequences of helping a Patriot when she is working for a Loyalist. She also shows a brave spirit when she stands up to Mrs. Lockton and demands information on the whereabouts of Ruth, whom Lockton said she has sold but in truth kept Ruth hiding away from Isabel to weaken her. This action results in her being branded with I for insolence on her right cheek as a punishment for standing up to her master, but towards the end of the novel she sees this mark standing for her name Isabel, and is proud to have everyone know her name. On the night of the Queen's Ball, she makes her move on her way to freedom, bringing Curzon along with her

=== Ruth ===
Isabel's five-year-old sister and also a slave. Ruth, who is suffering from epilepsy, often encounters fits from this sickness. She does not talk very often and does what she is told without question, which becomes the more desirable slave to Mrs. Lockton and she would be kept in Mrs. Lockton's chamber for hours to be her maid. Because of her aloof behavior, she is sometimes described as "Addlepated". As a young child, she is sometimes stubborn, for example, she asks for her baby doll every night before going to bed even though she knows that Mr. Robert Finch has taken away all their belongings. Her innocent and vulnerable nature makes her very dependent on Isabel. She is sold to a different slave owner in the West Indies midway through the book.

=== The Locktons ===
The Locktons are the owners of Isabel and her sister Ruth throughout most of the whole book. They are both loyalists and treat Isabel and Ruth poorly.

==== Elihu Lockton (Master Lockton) ====
A Loyalist who is very self-centered and ratty, his commitment to being a Loyalist is shown by his various attempts to get the rebels to join the British side; one of the attempts was to bribe them and hide the money in his wife's linen chest to discourage suspicion. This attempt, however, was discovered thanks to Isabel's report on her spying tasks. He also had a plan to assassinate President George Washington along with a group of Loyalists; unfortunately, their plan was also discovered by Isabel. At home, he is very abusive towards his wife, and he demands to be obeyed by everybody in the house. He also has a big belly, according to the Narrator.

==== Anne Lockton (Madam Lockton) ====
The main antagonist of Chains (and arguably the entire trilogy) and the wife of Elihu Lockton, she is also a Loyalist, though not as strongly committed as her husband. Very abusive towards Isabel, both physically and mentally, she does not call her by name and instead calls her Sal; in return demanding Isabel refers to her as Madam. Her harsh and brutal character is shown in her branding Isabel as a punishment for standing up to her and running away afterward. She strongly dislikes Isabel, as opposed to her liking Ruth because she is considered easier to order around. She is very impatient and she always blames Isabel for accidents she encounters, also often picking on the simplest mistakes such as not placing her dog statue in the right position after being dusted. When her husband's aunt falls sick, she hopes that her condition will cause her to die soon. When Lady Seymour's condition improves, Mrs. Lockton seems to be happy.

=== Curzon ===
A slave of Mr. Bellingham, a Patriot, he helps Isabel to achieve her wish for freedom by telling her to become a spy on the Locktons and try to find out any personal information that is sensitive to the political being and report back. While other slaves join the Patriot army to be free from slavery, Curzon says that he is simply a loyal American fighting for the independence of his country; he is even brave enough to risk life imprisonment as long as he is fighting for America's liberty. He is a very good and loyal friend to Isabel, calling her "Country," and he is always helping her in her attempts to seek the liberation of her and her sister.

=== Lady Seymour ===
Elihu Lockton's aunt, is very kind to slaves, unlike the rest of the people of the society. She acquaints Isabel and welcomes her dearly, and she always helps Isabel whenever she needs it. When Isabel comes to her house to pass the information that Mr. Lockton has been arrested and that Madam needs his aunt, she tells Isabel to come in the house and even serves her milk and cookies to nourish herself; something nobody at the time would do to slaves. She also took care of Isabel while in recovery right after getting branded, which in return was paid by Isabel helping her escape from the burning bush burning buildings and save her life. Lady Seymour aided Isabel in her escape from the Lockton household, and even gave Isabel money to help her survive as a slave on the run. One of Lady Seymour's most prized possessions is her portrait of her husband.

== Minor characters ==
=== Miss Mary Finch ===
The previous owner of Isabel and Ruth before she died and they were sold to the Locktons. She promised Isabel that she and her sister would be free when she dies, as a part of her will. Isabel views her as one of the nicer slave owners, describing her as being polite to her slaves by saying please and thank you when assigning tasks. Along with those acts, she taught Isabel to read and write.

=== Robert Finch ===
Miss Finch's nephew and only relative. He denies Miss Mary's will by saying that it is verbal and not physically extant thus making it non-legal and claims that the death of Miss Mary would mean Isabel and Ruth belongs to him. He then sells the girls to the Locktons and takes away all of the girls' only belongings, including Ruth's favorite baby doll.

=== Mr. Bellingham ===
A patriot who is Curzon's master. He is supposed to join the army for the Rebels, however, he pays Curzon to do it for him, also suggesting he will free Curzon if he joins.

=== Angelika ===
Angelika is Lady Seymour's servant who only speaks Dutch and does not show interest in learning English. She treated Isabel's wounds when Isabel woke up from being branded with the letter I for insolence.

=== Becky ===
She is a maid in the Lockton house, and she often helps Isabel whenever she is having tough times due to Mrs. Lockton's orders and actions. She reminds Isabel to do what Mrs. Lockton says, and she tells Isabel what and what not to do in the Lockton house. Becky also tries her best to get Isabel and Ruth out of situations where they would possibly get punished. She told Isabel about a slave who worked for the Locktons a couple of years earlier who got beaten severely for talking back to Madam, trying to get Isabel to stay cautious in her actions and hold her fists down.

=== Grandfather ===
He is an elder African-American slave who is in the line of the distribution of water from the Tea Water Pump. He seems to know much about the gossip of the war, which is passed around every morning when slaves come to the pump to obtain water for the day. His real name is not revealed, but most slaves refer to him as "Grandfather", because he is kind to everyone.

=== Colonel Regan ===
A colonel who works for Mr. Bellingham, he is Isabel's only hope to get her and her sister back to Rhode Islands. He retrieves information and evidence in the form of a list of names of the plan to assassinate General George Washington from Isabel, who secretly spied on Mr. Lockton during one of his meetings. He promised to help Isabel in return for the information, but he, later on, dismisses her when she begged for help when she ran away from Madam.

=== Captain Morse ===
Leader of the war prisoners of Fort Washington, he asks Isabel to be his messenger and bring messages from other military officers. He treats Isabel kindly and allows her to bring in food for Curzon, who was a prisoner in there. Captain Morse often takes some food from the basket that Isabel brings along.

=== Captain Farrar ===
A military officer who Isabel goes to in the midst of her task of being Captain Morse's personal messenger. He gives a note to Isabel which was demanded by Mrs. Lockton when she discovers that Isabel has been working for the rebels. Isabel surprisingly throws away the note in the hearth so that Mrs. Lockton would not be able to obtain the information in the note.

=== Pastor Weeks ===
A pastor that fulfills Isabel's parents funeral. He also helps Isabel with trying to get to a safe place, and where she would be best happy, even though she would still be a slave.

=== Old Ben ===
Pastor Week's horse who pulled the wagon carrying a pine coffin containing Miss Mary Finch's body at the beginning of the story.

=== Momma (Dinah) ===
Isabel and Ruth's mother who died when they were young from pox. Isabel sneaks her seeds when she gets sold to the Locktons.

=== Jenny ===
A woman who works at the tavern that Isabel and ruth were sold at. Described as having milky skin, freckles, and being large. Jenny was Dinah's friend while they were both indentured to their old master.

=== Papa ===
He is the father of Isabel and Ruth and the husband of Dinah, their mother. He has tribal scars from when he lived in Africa, and Isabel compares her own scar to his toward the end of the book while confined to the potato bin, all alone.

== Literary elements ==
The novel contains 45 chapters numbered in Roman numerals with the dates of the events in the chapter appearing beneath the chapter number. Under the dates, Anderson opens each chapter with quotations from important historic documents such as private letters, newspapers, the Common Sense pamphlet, the Declaration of Independence of the United States, and recorded opinions from various world leaders. These openings to each chapter give a perspective on what Isabel might face in the chapter.

== Honors ==
- Selected by Indie Booksellers for the Winter 2008 Kid's List
- Selected in the Booklist Editor's Choice:Books for Youth in 2008
- National Book Award finalist in 2008
- Winner of the IRA Teacher's Choices booklist in 2009
- Winner of the Scott O'Dell Award for Historical Fiction in 2009
- Winner of the Top 10 Black History Books for Youth in 2009
- Winner of the Notable Children's Book Award by the Association of Library Service to Children in 2009

== Bibliography ==
- Anderson, Laurie Halse (2008). Chains. Simon & Schuster. ISBN 978-1-4169-0586-8.
