= Speak (Anderson novel) =

1999 novel by Laurie Halse Anderson

- First edition
- Author: Laurie Halse Anderson
- Language: English
- Genre: Young adult fiction
- Publisher: Farrar Straus Giroux
- Publication date: October 22, 1999
- Publication place: United States
- Media type: Hardback and paperback
- Pages: 197 pp (first edition, hardback)
- ISBN: 0-374-37152-0
- OCLC: 40298254
- Dewey Decimal: [Fic] 21
- LC Class: PZ7.A54385 Sp 1999

Speak, published in 1999, is a young adult novel by Laurie Halse Anderson that tells the story of high school freshman Melinda Sordino. After Melinda is raped at an end of summer party, she calls the police, who break up the party. Melinda is then ostracized by her peers because she will not say why she called the police. Unable to verbalize what happened, Melinda nearly stops speaking altogether, expressing her voice through the art she produces for Mr. Freeman's class. This expression slowly helps Melinda acknowledge what happened, face her problems, and recreate her identity.

Speak is considered a problem novel, or trauma novel. Melinda's story is written in a diary format, consisting of a nonlinear plot and jumpy narrative that mimics the trauma she experienced. Additionally, Anderson employs intertextual symbolism in the narrative, incorporating fairy tale imagery, such as Hawthorne's The Scarlet Letter, and author Maya Angelou, to further represent Melinda's trauma.

Since its publication, the novel has won several awards and has been translated into sixteen languages. However, the book has faced censorship for its mature content. In 2004, Jessica Sharzer directed the film adaptation, starring Kristen Stewart as Melinda.

Speak: The Graphic Novel, illustrated by E.M. Carroll, was published by Farrar, Straus, and Giroux February 6, 2018. A 20th anniversary version of the novel featuring additional content was released in 2019 alongside the author's memoir, Shout.

== Synopsis ==
Freshman Melinda Sordino enters her first day of high school as an outcast. Her close friends from middle school have abandoned her and her classmates want nothing to do with her because she called the police at a high school party over the summer. Melinda rarely, if ever, speaks to anyone, but makes sardonic observations of the school environment. She is befriended by a chipper student who recently moved to town, Heather, but soon abandoned by Heather as well when she becomes obsessed with joining a group of popular girls who frown on her association with Melinda. She finds an abandoned janitor's closet and quietly turns it into a private sanctuary.

Melinda's grades begin to suffer as she cuts school to avoid the trauma of what really occurred at the party: Melinda was raped while drunk by a popular senior, Andy Evans, and called the police for help, but then ran home and has told no one about what the assault. Her withdrawn parents are troubled by her grades but don't seem to notice the other changes in her.

Melinda finds an outlet for her troubled inner life in art class, which is taught by the free-spirited Mr. Freeman. She is assigned trees as a theme for the school year and repeatedly tries different ways of representing them in art. She befriends her lab partner, David Petrakis, and slowly begins to reform relationships with her former friends. Melinda is troubled to see her former best friend, Rachel, has begun dating Andy. She attempts to warn her, but Rachel becomes angry and assumes Melinda is jealous of her dating a senior. Rachel later comes to believe Melinda, however, when Andy gropes her on prom night despite her telling him no. Melinda discovers several other girls contributing to a wall in the bathroom revealing Andy behaving similarly.

Andy discovers Melinda has accused him of rape and attacks her in her janitor's closet, denying he assaulted her and accusing her of being jealous that he dated Rachel instead of her. He attempts to rape Melinda again, but she manages to get the upper hand and call for help.

The story of Melinda standing up to her rapist spreads among the students, bringing her admiration for her bravery. The novel ends with Melinda completing her tree project and being comforted by Mr. Freeman, choosing to finally use her voice to tell him her story.

== Narrative style ==
Speak is written for young adults and middle/high school students. Labeled a problem novel, it centers on a character who gains the strength to overcome her trauma. The rape troubles Melinda as she struggles with wanting to repress the memory of the event, while simultaneously desiring to speak about it. Knox College English Professor Barbara Tanner-Smith calls Speak a trauma narrative, as the novel allows readers to identify with Melinda's struggles. Hofstra University Writing Studies and Rhetoric Professor Lisa DeTora considers Speak a coming-of-age novel, citing Melinda's "quest to claim a voice and identity". Booklist calls Speak an empowerment novel. According to author Chris McGee, Melinda is more than a victim. Melinda gains power from being silent as much as speaking. McGee considers Speak a confessional narrative; adults in Melinda's life constantly demand a "confession" from her. Similarly, author and Florida State University Professor Don Latham sees Speak as a "coming-out" story. He claims that Melinda uses both a literal and metaphorical closet to conceal and to cope with having been raped.

== Theme ==
One theme of Speak is finding one's voice. Another theme in the novel is identity. The story can also be viewed as speaking out against violence and victimization. Melinda feels guilty, even though she was a victim of sexual assault. Yet, by seeing other victims, like Rachel, Melinda is able to speak. Some see Speak as a story of recovery. According to Latham, writing/narrating her story has a therapeutic effect on Melinda, allowing her to "recreate" herself.

=== Post Traumatic Stress Disorder ===
One interpretation of Melinda's behavior is that it is symptomatic of Post Traumatic Stress Disorder (PTSD) as a result of her rape. Like other trauma survivors, Melinda's desire to both deny and proclaim what happened produces symptoms that both attract and deflect attention. Don Latham and Lisa DeTora both define Melinda's PTSD within the context of Judith Herman's three categories of classic PTSD symptoms: "hyperarousal", "intrusion", and "constriction". Melinda displays hyperarousal in her wariness of potential danger. Melinda will not go over to David's house after the basketball game, because she is afraid of what might happen. Intrusion is depicted in the rape's disruption of Melinda's consciousness. She tries to forget the event, but the memories keep resurfacing in her mind. Constriction is illustrated in Melinda's silence and withdrawal from society. Latham views Melinda's slow recovery as queer in its diversion from the normal treatment of trauma. Melinda's recovery comes as a result of her own efforts, without professional help. Further, DeTora notes the connection between trauma and "the unspeakable".

== Point of view ==
Speak is a first-person, diary-like narrative. Written in the voice of Melinda Sordino, it features lists, subheadings, spaces between paragraphs and script-like dialogue. The fragmented style mimics Melinda's trauma. The choppy sentences and blank spaces on the pages relate to Melinda's fascination with Cubism. According to Chris McGee and DeTora, Anderson's writing style allows the reader to see how Melinda struggles with "producing the standard, cohesive narrative" expected in a teen novel. Melinda's distracted narrative reiterates the idea that "no one really wants to hear what you have to say". In her article, "Like Falling Up into a Storybook", Barbara Tannert-Smith says,

"In Speak, Anderson of necessity has to employ a nonlinear plot and disruptive temporality to emphasize Melinda's response to her traumatic experience: the novelist has to convey stylistically exactly how her protagonist experiences self-estrangement and a sense of shattered identity".

By disrupting the present with flashbacks of the past, Anderson further illustrates the structure of trauma. Anderson organizes the plot around the four quarters of Melinda's freshman year, starting the story in the middle of Melinda's struggle. Anderson superimposed the fragmented trauma plot-line upon this linear high school narrative, making the narrative more believable.

== Symbolism and greater meaning ==
Throughout Speak, Anderson represents Melinda's trauma and recovery symbolically. Barbara Tannert-Smith refers to Speak as a "postmodern revisionary fairy tale" for its use of fairy tale imagery. She sees Merryweather High School as the "ideal fairy tale domain", featuring easily categorized characters—a witchy mother, a shape-shifting best friend, a beastly rapist. Mirrors, traditional fairy tale tools, signify Melinda's struggle with her shattered identity. After being raped, Melinda does not recognize herself in her reflection. Disgusted by what she sees, Melinda avoids mirrors. According to Don Latham, Melinda's aversion to her reflection illustrates acknowledgement of her fragmented identity. In fact, the only mirror Melinda can "see herself" in, is the three-way mirror in the dressing room. Rather than giving the illusion of a unified self, the three-way mirror reflects Melinda's shattered self. Likewise, Melinda is fascinated by Cubism, because it represents what is beyond the surface. Melinda uses art to express her voice. Her post-traumatic artwork illustrates her pain. The trees symbolize Melinda's growth. The walls of Melinda's closet are covered in her tree sketches, creating a metaphorical forest in which she hides from reliving her trauma. According to Don Latham, the closets in the story symbolize Melinda's queer coping strategies. Melinda uses the closet to conceal the truth.

Anderson incorporates precursor texts that parallel Melinda's experience. In the story, Melinda's English class studies Nathaniel Hawthorne's The Scarlet Letter, which features similar fairy tale imagery. Hester Prynne, an outcast protagonist like Melinda, lives in a cottage at the edge of the woods. Hester's cottage parallels Melinda's closet. For both women, the seclusion of the forest represents a space beyond social demands. The deciphering of Hawthorne's symbolism mimics the process faced by readers of Melinda's narrative. Similarly, Anderson connects Melinda's trauma to that of Maya Angelou, author of I Know Why the Caged Bird Sings. Melinda places a poster of Angelou in her closet. She admires Angelou because her novel was banned by the school board. Melinda and Angelou were both outcasts. Like Melinda, Angelou was silenced following her childhood rape.

== Honors and accolades ==
Speak is a New York Times Best-Seller. The novel received several awards and honors, including the American Library Association's 2000 Michael Printz Honor and the 2000 Golden Kite Award. It was also selected as a 2000 ALA Best Book for Young Adults. Speak gained critical acclaim for its portrayal of the trauma caused by rape. Barbara Tannert-Smith, author of "Like Falling Up Into a Storybook: Trauma and Intertextual Repetition in Laurie Halse Anderson's Speak.", claims the story's ability to speak the reader's language brought about its commercial success. Publishers Weekly says, Speak's "overall gritty realism and Melinda's hard-won metamorphosis will leave readers touched and inspired". Ned Vizzini, for The New York Times, calls it "different", "a grittily realistic portrait of sexual violence in high school." Author Don Latham calls Speak "painful, smart, and darkly comic".

=== Awards ===
Speak has won several awards and honors, including:

- 1999 National Book Award Finalist
- 1999 BCCB Blue Ribbon Book
- 2000 SCBWI Golden Kite Award for Fiction
- 2000 Horn Book Fanfare Best Book of the Year
- 2000 ALA Best Books for Young Adults
- 2000 Printz Honor Book
- 2000 Top Ten Best Books for Young Adults
- 2000 Fiction Quick Pick for Reluctant Young Adult Readers
- 2000 Edgar Allan Poe Best Young Adult Award Finalist
- 2001 New York Times Paperback Children's Best Seller
- 2005 New York Times Paperback Children's Best Seller

=== Censorship ===
Speak's difficult subject matter has led to censorship of the novel. Speak is ranked 60th on the ALA's list of Top 100 Banned/Challenged Books for 2000–2009 and 25th for 2010–2019. In 2020, the book was named the fourth most banned and challenged book in the United States "because it was thought to contain a political viewpoint and it was claimed to be biased against male students, and for the novel's inclusion of rape and profanity."

In September 2010, Wesley Scroggins, a professor at Missouri State University, wrote an article, "Filthy books demeaning to Republic education", in which he claimed that Speak, along with Slaughterhouse-Five and Twenty Boy Summer, should be banned for "exposing children to immorality". Scroggins claimed that Speak should be "classified as soft pornography" and, therefore, removed from high school English curriculum. In its 2010-2011 bibliography, "Books Challenged or Banned", the Newsletter of Intellectual Freedom lists Speak as having been challenged in Missouri schools because of its "soft-pornography" and "glorification of drinking, cursing, and premarital sex."

In the 2006 Platinum Edition of Speak, and on her blog, Laurie Halse Anderson spoke out against censorship. Anderson wrote:

...But censoring books that deal with difficult, adolescent issues does not protect anybody. Quite the opposite. It leaves kids in the darkness and makes them vulnerable. Censorship is the child of fear and the father of ignorance. Our children cannot afford to have the truth of the world withheld from them.

In her scholarly monograph, Laurie Halse Anderson: Speaking in Tongues, Wendy J. Glenn claims that Speak "has generated more academic response than any other novel Anderson has written." Despite hesitancy to teach a novel with "mature subject matter," English teachers are implementing Speak in the classroom as a study of literary analysis, as well as tool to teach students about sexual harassment. The novel gives students the opportunity to talk about several teen issues, including: school cliques, sex, and parental relationships. Of teaching Speak in the classroom Jackett says, "We have the opportunity as English teachers to have an enormously positive impact on students' lives. Having the courage to discuss the issues found in Speak is one way to do just that." By sharing in Melinda's struggles, students may find their own voices and learn to cope with trauma and hardships. According to Janet Alsup, teaching Speak in the classroom, can help students become more critically literate. Students may not feel comfortable talking about their own experiences, but they are willing to talk about what happens to Melinda. Elaine O'Quinn claims that books like Speak allow students to explore inner dialogue. Speak provides an outlet for students to think critically about their world.

== Related work ==
Anderson's 2002 novel Catalyst shares its Merryweather High setting with Speak. Melinda Sordino, now in tenth grade and having regained control over her life, appears for a few pages. When a fellow student, Kate Malone, has a mental breakdown, she counsels and helps her through the rough patch. It is stated that Andy Evans was found guilty but not sent to prison. Sentenced to probation and registering as a sex offender, he is normally under house arrest and must be electronically tagged by an ankle monitor, having limited contact with others except his caregivers.

In the 10th anniversary edition of Speak, Anderson explained that she was seriously considering making a sequel, but could not think of a basic plot, citing that sequels are usually meant to build on a previous film's popularity, using Jaws: The Revenge as an example.

== See also ==
- Rape trauma syndrome
