= Family Lore =

2023 fantasy novel by Elizabeth Acevedo

- Author: Elizabeth Acevedo
- Publisher: Ecco Press
- Publication date: August 1, 2023
- ISBN: 9780063207264

Family Lore is a 2023 fantasy novel by Elizabeth Acevedo. Acevedo's first novel intended for an adult audience, Family Lore has been shortlisted for the 2023 Center for Fiction First Novel Prize.

== Plot ==
The novel begins with a Dominican-American family from the Dominican Republic: sisters Mathilde, Flor, Pastora, Camila and cousins Ona and Yadi, whom moved to New York City at different times. Flor foretells her own death from her dreams, hosting a living wake for herself, refusing to tell anyone.

Ona and Yadi face their own challenges. Ona discovers that she has uterine fibroids and the possibility that she would not be able to conceive to inherit her family’s legacy. Yadi reunites with her longtime crush from high school, Ant, who was imprisoned for 10 years. Ant has also been in a relationship with another woman from prison, much to Yadi’s dismay.

Flor joins her ancestors in protecting the Marte family. Ona learns that she has conceived a child, with Flor as an ancestor assisting the process.

== Reception ==
Despite some mixed reviews, Family Lore was generally well received by critics. Star Tribune's Kevin Canfield called the novel "vibrant", writing that "Acevedo wields her own sort of magic in her first novel for adults, deftly blending comedy and sorrow". Also highlighting the novel's fantastical elements, Publishers Weekly noted that "the various magical elements aren’t very well developed".

On behalf of The Washington Post, Patricia Engel called the novel "enchanting" and highlighted how Acevedo "strikes a rousing prose blend of bluntness, lyricism, slang, pop culture references, and the interlingual expansiveness fluidly employed by first- and second-generation immigrants". The Observer's Stephanie Merritt also discussed the writing style, noting that "Acevedo’s background in spoken-word poetry shines through in the energy and lyricism of her prose". Kirkus Reviews was more critical, noting that the "prose that fails to sing consistently".

Some reviewers commented on the book's structure, in which "the present narrative is frequently interrupted by nostalgia and melancholy tied to the motherland, knots of memories of Santo Domingo". Rebecca Carroll, writing for The New York Times Book Review, noted that "even with the scaffolding of a family tree in the book’s preface, the narrative isn’t always easy to follow (which one could argue is perhaps the point)". However, Carroll added that Acevedo's "brief explanatory passages [...] help anchor the transitions back and forth through time". San Francisco Chronicle's Alexis Burling added to sentiment, referring to novel as a "dizzying mosaic" whose "structure [...] can be a head-scratcher at times, even with the Tolstoy-esque character map at the beginning".

Multiple reviewers highlighted the characters. Carroll wrote, "the depth, grace and nuance that Acevedo gives her characters is palpable; her love for these women comes through with arresting clarity". Canfield expanded on this point to say, "Acevedo's attention to her character's mannerisms and habits makes them relatable". Burling, however, noted that "not every character is given her due" as "some of the other characters’ backstories and their supernatural gifts are at best slightly underdeveloped and, at worst, inexplicably glossed over". Kirkus also noted that the characters are "somewhat flat".

Booklist's Heather Booth also reviewed the audiobook, which Acevedo narrated alongside Sixta Morel and Danyeli Rodriguez del Orbe. Booth highlighted the differences in narration from Acevedo's "rich, fluid, [and] rhythmic" reading to Morel's, which is "warm and flow[s] with a practiced sensibility". This is further compared to Rodriguez Del Orbe's "poet’s cadence", which is "by turns halting, impassioned, and guarded".

== Awards and honors ==
Year	Award	Category	Result	Ref
2023	Center for Fiction First Novel Prize	—	Shortlisted	
2024	NAACP Image Awards	Fiction	Longlisted	
