= Vet Volunteers =

Series of children's books by Laurie Halse Anderson

Vet Volunteers, previously published as Wild at Heart, is a series of children's books written by New York Times author Laurie Halse Anderson.

The series takes place at the Wild at Heart Animal Clinic run by Dr. J. J. Mac, otherwise known as Dr. Mac. It follows the adventures of five children who volunteer at the clinic and solve mysteries as they help the animals there.

== Books in the series ==
1. Fight for Life: Maggie (2007)
2. Homeless: Sunita (2007)
3. Trickster: David (2008)
4. Manatee Blues: Brenna (2008)
5. Say Good-Bye: Zoe (2008)
6. Storm Rescue: Sunita (2008)
7. Teacher's Pet: Maggie (2009)
8. Trapped: Brenna (2009)
9. Fear of Falling: David (2009)
10. Time to Fly: Zoe (2009)
11. Masks: Sunita (2012)
12. End of the Race: Maggie (2012)
13. New Beginnings: Jules and Josh (2012)
14. Acting Out: Zoe (2012)
15. Helping Hands: Jules and Josh (2013)
16. Treading Water: Brenna (2014)
