= Wandering in Strange Lands =

2020 memoir by Morgan Jenkins

- Author: Morgan Jerkins
- Audio read by: Morgan Jerkins
- Language: English
- Genre: Memoir
- Publisher: Harper
- Publication date: August 4, 2020
- Publication place: United States
- Media type: Print
- ISBN: 978-0-062-87304-0

Wandering in Strange Lands: A Daughter of the Great Migration Reclaims Her Roots is a memoir by Morgan Jerkins, published on August 4, 2020 by Harper.

== Reception ==
Wandering in Strange Lands received excellent reviews from The New York Times and Publishers Weekly, as well as a starred review from Booklist. The book was also well-reviewed by Kirkus, USA Today, and BookPage. Library Journal gave it a mixed review.

The book landed on several "Best of" lists, including Time's "100 Must-Read Books of 2020" and Good Housekeeping's "Best Books of the Year." Book Riot featured it in the following listicles: "5 Great New Nonfiction Books to Help Understand Our Times", "Exploring America Through Books", and "45 Upcoming Books By Black Authors You Can Preorder Right Now."

The book also received the following accolades:

- Goodreads Choice Award Nominee for History & Biography (2020)
- Booklist Top of the List for Adult Nonfiction (2020)
- Booklist Editors' Choice for Adult Books (2020)

The audiobook was lauded by BuzzFeed and was an Audie Award for Nonfiction (2021) finalist.
