= Shout (memoir) =

2019 memoir by Laurie Halse Anderson

- Cover of Shout
- Author: Laurie Halse Anderson
- Language: English
- Genre: Memoir, Novel in verse
- Publisher: Viking Books
- Publication date: March 12, 2019
- Publication place: United States
- Media type: Print (hardcover, paperback), Audiobook
- ISBN: 978-0-67-001210-7

Shout: The True Story of a Survivor Who Refused to be Silenced is a poetic memoir by Laurie Halse Anderson, published March 12, 2019 by Viking Books. The book is a New York Times best seller.

== Reception ==
=== Print book ===
Shout received starred reviews from Kirkus, Booklist, BookPage, and Publishers Weekly, as well as positive reviews from New York Times, Los Angeles Times, and Common Sense Media. Kirkus, School Library Journal, Horn Book, NPR, Chicago Public Library, and Publishers Weekly named it one of the best books of the year. It's also a Junior Library Guild selection. Kirkus Reviews stated the book was "necessary for every home, school, and public library."

Shout Book Awards
| Year | Award | Result | Ref. |
|---|---|---|---|
| 2019 | Booklist Editors' Choice: Books for Youth | Selection | |
| 2019 | Booklist's Top of the List | Selection | |
| 2019 | Goodreads Choice Award for Poetry | Winner | |
| 2019 | National Book Award for Young People's Literature | Longlist | |
| 2019 | The Center for Children's Books Blue Ribbon | Selection | |
| 2020 | Rise: A Feminist Book Project | Top Ten | |
| 2020 | YALSA's Quick Picks for Reluctant Young Adult Readers | Selection | |

=== Audiobook ===
The audiobook also received a starred review from Booklist.

Shout Audiobook Awards
| Year | Award | Result |
|---|---|---|
| 2019 | Booklist Editors' Choice: Youth Audio | Top of the List |
| 2020 | YALSA's Amazing Audiobooks for Young Adults | Top Ten |
