= Clap When You Land =

2020 young adult novel by Elizabeth Acevedo

- First edition cover
- Author: Elizabeth Acevedo
- Audio read by: Elizabeth Acevedo and Melania-Luisa Marte
- Cover artist: Bijou Karman, Erin Fitzsimmons
- Genre: Young adult fiction
- Set in: Dominican Republic, New York City
- Publisher: HarperTeen
- Publication date: May 5, 2020
- ISBN: 978-0-06-2882-76-9

Clap When You Land, written by Elizabeth Acevedo, is a young adult novel published by HarperTeen on May 5, 2020. The audiobook, produced by Harper Audio and narrated by Melania-Luisa Marte and Elizabeth Acevedo, was released on the same date.

Clap When You Land is a New York Times and IndieBound bestseller. It also received "a standing ovation" from Kirkus Reviews.

The novel is written from two perspectives, those of Yahaira Ríos in New York City, New York and Camino Ríos in Sosúa, Dominican Republic. These two teenage girls are drawn together after a plane crashes while traveling between the Dominican Republic and New York City, leading them to discover that they shared a late father.

== Reception ==
Clap When You Land is a New York Times and Indiebound bestseller. It also received "a standing ovation" from Kirkus Reviews.

The book received a starred review from Publishers Weekly, School Library Journal, and Kirkus, as well as positive reviews from Bulletin of the Center for Children's Books, and Booklist.

Kirkus named it one of the best books of the year.

Clap When You Land Book Awards
Year	Award	Category	Result	Ref
2020	Goodreads Choice Awards	Young Adult Fiction	Winner	
2020	Kirkus Prize	—	Finalist	
2021	Carnegie Medal	—	Shortlist	
2021	Rise: A Feminist Book Project	—	Top Ten	
2021	YALSA's Best Fiction for Young Adults	—	Top Ten	
2021	YALSA's Teens' Top Ten	—	Nominee	

The audiobook received a starred review from Booklist.

Clap When You Land Audiobook Awards
Year	Award		Result	Ref
2020	Booklist Top of the List for Youth Audio	—	Selection	
2021	ALSC's Notable Children's Recordings	—	Selection	
2021	Audie Award	Young Adult	Winner	
2021	Audie Award	Multi-Voiced Performance	Winner	
2021	Odyssey Award	—	Honor Book	
2021	YALSA's Amazing Audiobooks for Young Adults	—	Top Ten	

== Book banning controversy ==
The book is permanently banned from libraries in Nebo School District, Utah.
