= Africa Is Not a Country =

2022 nonfiction book by Dipo Faloyin

- Author: Dipo Faloyin
- Language: English
- Subject: Africa
- Genre: Non-fiction
- Publisher: W. W. Norton & Company
- Publication date: September 6, 2022
- Publication place: United Kingdom
- Pages: 380

Africa Is Not a Country is a 2022 non-fiction book written by Dipo Faloyin. The book is subtitled Notes on a Bright Continent in the United States and Breaking Stereotypes of Modern Africa in the United Kingdom.

The book was published by W. W. Norton & Company on September 6, 2022.

== Overview ==
Africa Is Not a Country seeks to challenge common stereotypes about Africa that are found in the Western world. Faloyin argued that Africa has been treated "as if it were a single country, devoid of nuance."

== Author ==
Faloyin was born in Chicago, raised in Lagos, and currently lives in London. He is a senior editor and writer at VICE, and has written for The Guardian, Esquire, Newsweek, Dazed, I-D, HuffPost, Refinery29 and Prospect.

== Critical reception ==
Kirkus Reviews writes, "A well-researched, cleareyed deconstruction of highly flawed conventional wisdom about Africa."

Conservative writer and author Victor Davis Hanson, "Africa Is Not a Country aims to set that record straight, while also painting a portrait of modern Africa as it is today – a bustling, generally thriving continent of 54 countries and 1.4 billion people. Yes, there are dictators, but there are also stable democracies, a growing middle class and plenty to feel positive about.
