= Elizabeth Acevedo =

American poet and author

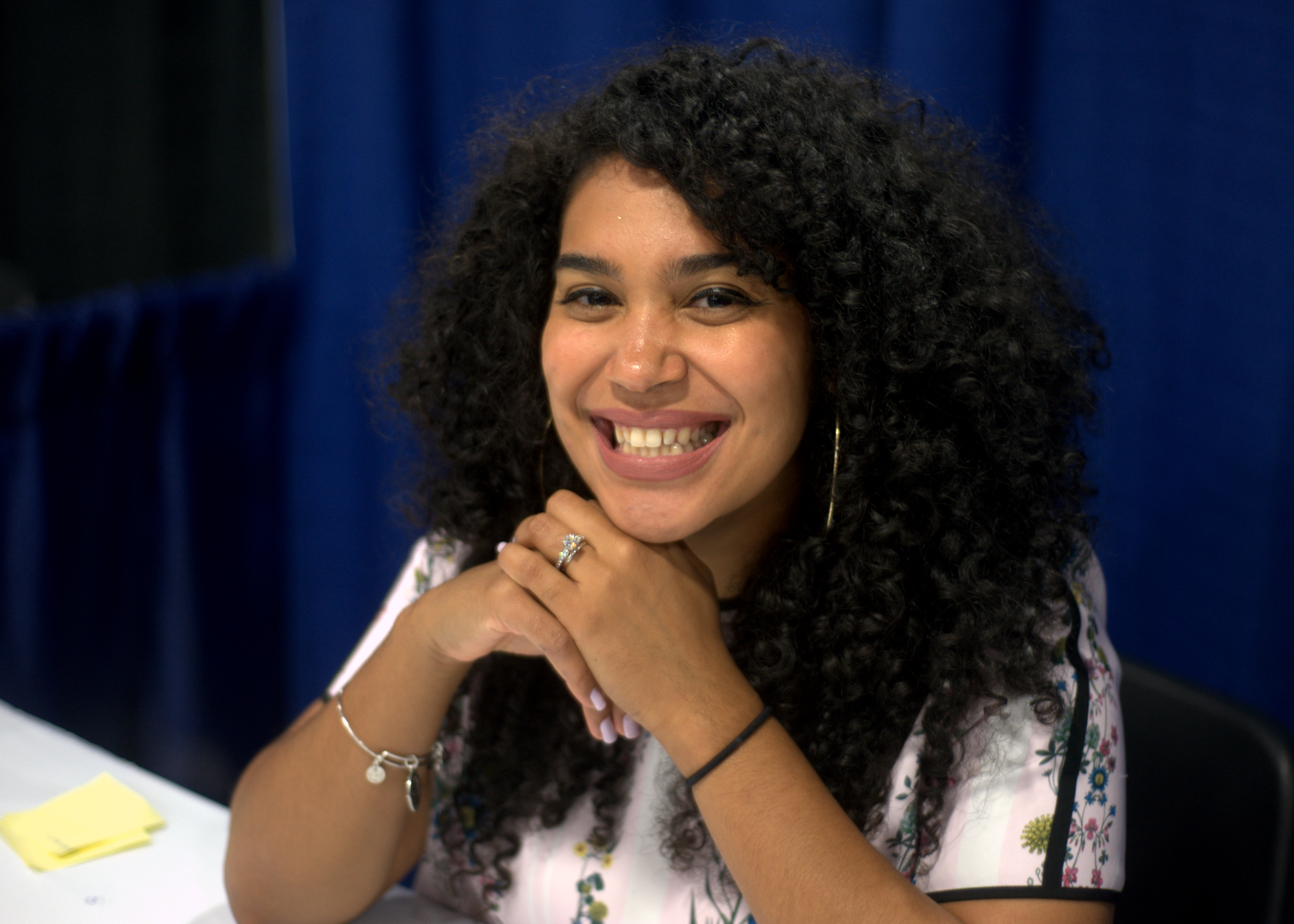
- Acevedo in 2018
- Born: New York City, U.S.
- Education: Beacon High School; The George Washington University (BA); University of Maryland (MFA)
- Occupations: Author, Poet, Writer
- Spouse: Shakir Cannon-Moye
- Writing career
- Genre: young adult fiction
- Notable works: The Poet X; With the Fire on High; Clap When You Land
- Notable awards: National Book Award; Carnegie Medal
- Website: www.acevedowrites.com

Elizabeth Acevedo is an American poet and author. In September 2022, the Poetry Foundation named her the year's Young People's Poet Laureate.

Acevedo is the author of the young adult novels The Poet X, With the Fire on High, and Clap When You Land. The Poet X is a New York Times Bestseller, National Book Award Winner, and Carnegie Medal winner. She is also the winner of the 2019 Michael L. Printz Award, the 2018 Pura Belpre Award, and the Boston-Globe Hornbook Award Prize for Best Children's Fiction of 2018. She lives in Washington, DC.

== Early life and education ==
Acevedo was raised in Harlem, New York City, by Dominican immigrant parents. She is the youngest child and only daughter. By the age of 12, Acevedo decided she wanted to be a rapper, but later realized she really wanted to perform poetry. She attended The Beacon School, where she met English teacher Abby Lublin. Lublin recruited Acevedo to join her after-school poetry club to further improve her work.

At the age of 14, Acevedo competed in her first poetry slam at the Nuyorican Poets Café, and then participated in open mics at various venues in the city, including Bowery Poetry Club and Urban Word NYC.

She went to church every Sunday with her mother and participated in every sacrament. Acevedo does not practice Catholicism anymore, but still considers her relationship with her religion to be developing. She questions the teaching of religion; her book With the Fire on High is influenced by the fact that religion is empowering but "sometimes makes women and young girls question themselves."

She attended George Washington University in Washington, D.C., where she graduated with a Bachelor of Arts in performing arts and designed her own degree using courses in performing arts, English, and sociology. She then earned an M.F.A. in Creative Writing at the University of Maryland, College Park and served as an adjunct professor for bachelor level creative writing courses.

== Career ==
Acevedo began her career teaching eighth grade in Prince George's County, Maryland. While coaxing a student to read more, the student said she was not reading because "these books aren't about us." Acevedo realized her students were affected by the lack of diversity in their books and not by their capabilities. She then bought books that her students could relate to, and realized that she had the power to write such books too.

Following graduation from George Washington University, Acevedo went into the classroom as a 2010 Teach for America Corps participant. She continued on to teach eighth grade English in Prince George's County, Maryland. Although the school's population was 78 percent Latino and 20 percent black, she was the first Latino teacher to teach a core subject.

She is a previous National Slam Champion, as well as former head coach for the D.C. Youth Slam Team. She has performed at Lincoln Center, Madison Square Garden, the John F. Kennedy Center for the Performing Arts, South Africa's State Theatre, Bozar in Brussels, and the National Library of Kosovo. She has also delivered several TED Talks, and her masterful poetry videos have been featured in Latina magazine, Cosmopolitan, HuffPost, and Upworthy.

She is also the author of three young adult novels. Beastgirl and Other Origin Myths was published in 2016 and was a finalist for YesYes Chapbook Prize. Her first novel, The Poet X, was published in 2018. With the Fire on High is Acevedo's third novel, released in May 2019. Her fourth, Clap When You Land, was published in May 2020. It is about two sisters who grow up unaware of each other while living in different countries, but learn of each other after their father dies. The book was a Boston Globe-Horn Book Honor Book.

Acevedo is both a CantoMundo fellow and Cave Canem fellow. Her poems have appeared or are forthcoming from Poetry, Puerto Del Sol, Callaloo, The Notre Dame Review, and other publications.

She also works as a visiting instructor at an adjudicated youth center in Washington, D.C., where she works with incarcerated women and with teenagers.

== Personal life ==
Acevedo is of Afro-Latina ethnicity. Acevedo grew up in a conservative and devout Catholic household. However, she no longer practices the religion. She lives in Washington, D.C., with her husband, Shakir Cannon-Moye.

== Critical response ==
=== The Poet X ===
The Poet X is a New York Times Bestseller. The book highlights the struggles of growing up as a Latina girl dealing with her sexuality and religion, and finding her own voice. Kirkus Reviews describes Poet X as "Poignant and real; beautiful and intense".

Cleyvis Natera's review of Poet X for Aster(ix) Journal relates to the main character, Xiomara. Natera writes that Poet X is relatable to teenage girls dealing with their first love and strict parents that just don't understand, and who are finding themselves or growing into the person that they're meant to be. She urges its readers to buy the book.

The Poet X received the following accolades:

- 2019: American Library Association's (ALA) top ten Amazing Audiobooks for Young Adults
- 2019: ALA's top ten Best Fiction for Young Adults
- 2019: Michael L. Printz Award
- 2019: Pura Belpre Award
- 2019: Odyssey Award for Excellence in Audiobook Production
- 2019: Golden Kite Honor Book for Young Adult Fiction
- 2019: The Amelia Bloomer Book List
- 2019: Walter Dean Myers Award for Outstanding Children's Literature
- 2019: Carnegie Medal
- 2019 Américas Award Honor Book
- 2018: Boston Globe Horn Book Award
- 2018 National Book Award for Young People's Literature
- 2018: Kirkus Prize finalist

=== With the Fire on High ===
With the Fire on High received the following accolades:

- 2020: ALA's top ten Amazing Audiobooks for Young Adults
- 2020: ALA's top ten Best Fiction for Young Adults
- 2020: Amelia Bloomer Book List
- 2020: Audie Award for Narration by the Author or Authors
- 2020: Award Award Nominee for Young Adult
- 2019: Goodreads Choice Awards Nominee for Young Adult Fiction
- Golden Kite Honor Book

=== Clap When You Land ===
Clap When You Land is a New York Times and Indiebound bestseller. It also received "a standing ovation" from Kirkus Reviews.

Clap When You Land received the following accolades:

- 2021 Carnegie Medal Nominee for Shortlist
- 2021 Odyssey Honor Audiobook
- 2021 American Library Association's (ALA) Top Ten Best Fiction for Young Adults
- 2021 ALA's Top Ten Amazing Audiobooks for Young Adults
- 2021 Association for Library Services to Children (ALSC) Notable Children's Recording
- 2021 Audie Award for Multi-Voiced Performance
- 2021 Audie Award for Young Adult
- 2020 Goodreads Choice Awards winner for Young Adult Fiction
- 2020 Booklist Top of the List for Youth Audio
- 2020 Kirkus Prize Finalist

=== Family Lore ===
Family Lore received the following accolades:

- 2024: NAACP Image Awards for Outstanding Literary Work – Fiction

== Bibliography ==
=== As writer ===
==== Young adult novels ====
- —— (2016). Beastgirl and Other Origin Myths (paperback ed.). YesYes Books. ISBN 9781936919451.
- —— (2018). The Poet X (hardcover 1st ed.). HarperTeen. ISBN 9780062662804.
- —— (2019). With the Fire on High (hardcover 1st ed.). HarperTeen. ISBN 9780062662835.
- —— (2020). Clap When You Land (hardcover 1st ed.). Quill Tree Books. ISBN 9780062882769.
- —— (2026). Anger Is Only a Shadow (hardcover 1st ed.). Quill Tree Books. ISBN 9780062882790.

==== Adult fiction ====
- —— (2023). Family Lore (hardcover 1st ed.). Ecco. ISBN 9780063207264.

==== In anthologies ====
- Beastgirl and Other Origin Myths (YesYes Books, 2016)
- Because I Was A Girl: True Stories for Girls of All Ages (Henry Holt, 2017) (with stories by Victoria Aveyard, Libba Bray, Melissa de la Cruz, Quvenzhané Wallis, Francesca Zambello)
- Women of Resistance: Poems for a New Feminism (OR Books, 2018) (with stories by Danielle Barnhart, Iris Mahan, Ryka Aoki, Rosebud Ben-Ori, Safia Elhillo, Jade Lascelles)
- Ink Knows No Borders (Seven Stories, 2019) (with poems by Samira Ahmed, Erika L. Sánchez, Ocean Vuong, Fatimah Asghar, Chen Chen, Ada Limón, Kaveh Akbar, Hala Alyan, Safia Elhillo, Jenny Xie, and Bao Phi)
- Woke: A Young Poet's Call to Justice (Roaring Brook Press, 2020) (with poems by Mahogany L. Browne and Olivia Gatwood)
- Wild Tongues Can't Be Tamed: 15 Voices from the Latinx Diaspora (Flatiron Books, 2021) (with stories by Cristina Arreola, Ingrid Rojas Contreras, Naima Coster, Natasha Diaz, Kahlil Haywood, Zakiya Jamal, Janel Martinez, Jasminne Mendez, Meg Medina, Mark Oshiro, Julian Randall, Lilliam Rivera, and Ibi Zoboi)

=== As audiobook narrator ===
- The Poet X by Elizabeth Acevedo (HarperTeen, 2018)
- Pride by Ibi Zoboi (Balzer+Bray, 2018)
- With the Fire on High by Elizabeth Acevedo (HarperTeen, 2019)
- Clap When You Land by Elizabeth Acevedo (HarperTeen, 2020)
- Family Lore by Elizabeth Acevedo (Ecco, 2023)

== See also ==
- CantoMundo Fellows
- Cave Canem Fellow
- Latino poetry
