= Laurie Halse Anderson =

American writer (born 1961)

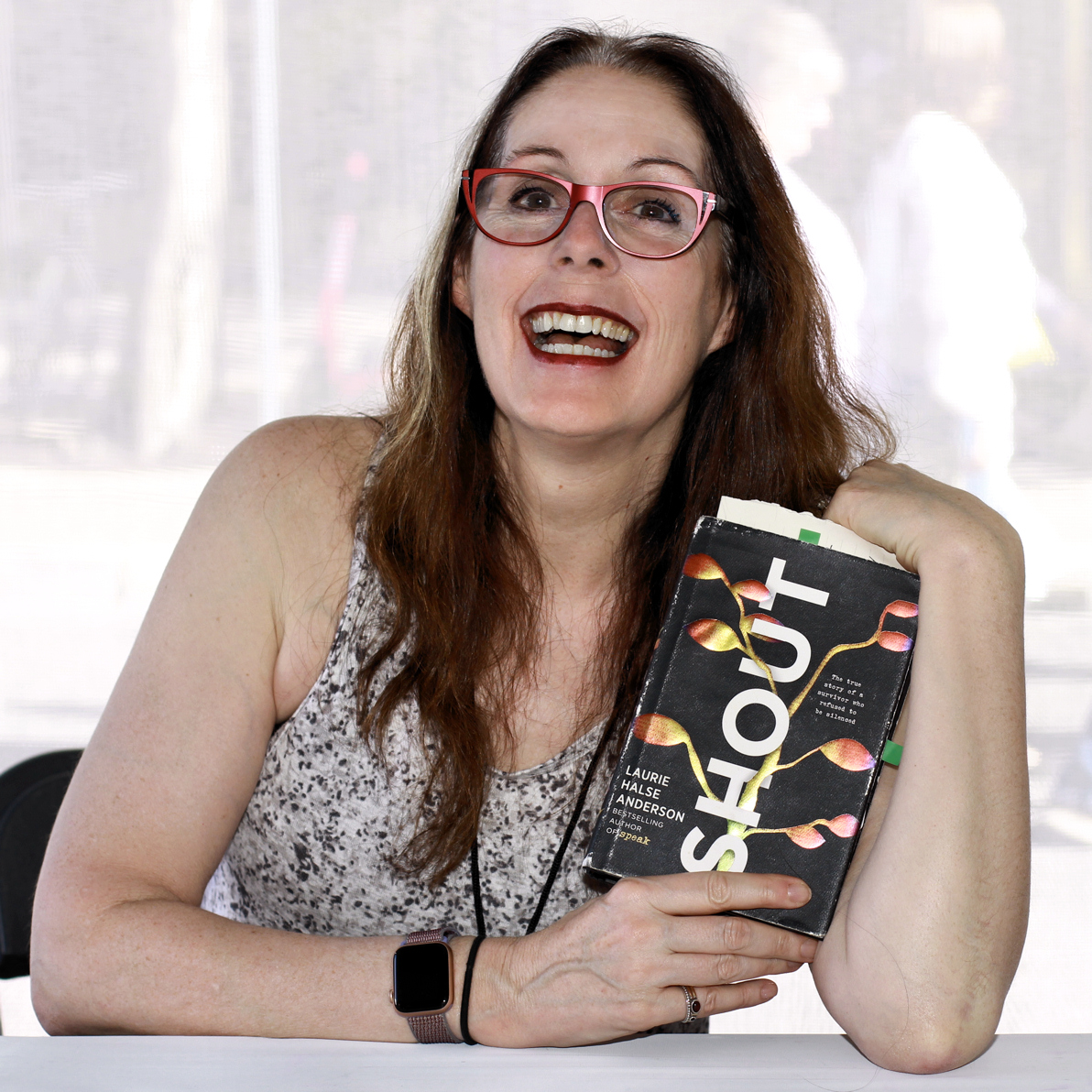
- Anderson at the 2019 Texas Book Festival
- Born: Laurie Beth Halse; October 23, 1961 (age 64); Potsdam, New York, U.S.
- Occupation: Writer
- Spouse(s): 1) Greg Anderson (divorced); 2) Scot Larrabee
- Children: 4
- Writing career
- Genres: Young adult fiction, historical fiction, picture books for young readers
- Notable works: Speak (1999); Fever, 1793 (2000); Catalyst (2002); Twisted (2007); Wintergirls (2009); Shout (2019); Seeds of America trilogy; Chains (2008); Forge (2010); Ashes (2016)
- Notable awards: Margaret A. Edwards Award; 2009
- Website: madwomanintheforest.com

Laurie Halse Anderson (born Laurie Beth Halse; October 23, 1961) is an American writer known for children's and young adult novels. She received the Margaret A. Edwards Award from the American Library Association in 2010 for her contribution to young adult literature and in 2023 she received the Astrid Lindgren Memorial Award.

She was first recognized for her novel Speak, published in 1999.

== Early life ==
Laurie Beth Halse was born October 23, 1961, to Rev. Frank A. Halse Jr. and Joyce Holcomb Halse in Potsdam, New York. She grew up there with her younger sister, Lisa. As a student, she showed an early interest in writing, specifically during the second grade. Anderson enjoyed reading—especially science fiction and fantasy—as a teenager, but never envisioned herself becoming a writer.

Anderson attended Fayetteville-Manlius High School, in Manlius, New York, a suburb of Syracuse.

During Anderson's senior year, she moved out of her parents' house at the age of sixteen and lived as an exchange student for thirteen months on a pig farm in Denmark. After her experience in Denmark, Anderson moved back home to work at a clothing store, earning the minimum wage. This motivated her to attend college. She graduated from Georgetown University with a degree in languages and linguistics.

== Family ==
Laurie Halse Anderson married Greg Anderson. In 1985, they had their first child, Stephanie Holcomb. Two years later, they had their second child, Meredith Lauren. The couple later divorced. Years later, Anderson moved back to Mexico, New York. She married Scot Larrabee. They combined their families — Anderson's two daughters and Larrabee's two children, Jessica and Christian.

== Career ==
Anderson began her career as a freelance journalist and worked at The Philadelphia Inquirer in the early years of her career. During this time, Anderson also began to write children's and young adult novels. Despite receiving rejection letters, Anderson released her first children's novel, Ndito Runs, in 1996, based on Kenyan Olympic marathon runners who ran to and from school each day. Later that year, she had her story Turkey Pox published. This story was inspired by her daughter, Meredith, who broke out with chickenpox on Thanksgiving. In 1998, Anderson published No Time For Mother's Day, featuring the same characters.

During her early career, Anderson wrote several pieces of non-fiction. The first was a children's book featuring Saudi Arabia. She co-authored a book about parenting shy children with Dr. Ward Swallow.

== Selected texts ==
=== Speak (1999) ===
In 1999, Farrar, Straus and Giroux published Anderson's best-known novel to date, Speak. It was a New York Times Bestseller and was adapted into film in 2004, starring Kristen Stewart as Melinda Sordino. The novel became a finalist for the National Book Award and won Anderson honors for its portrayal of a thirteen-year-old girl who becomes mute after a sexual assault. The paperback version was published in 2001 by Puffin Books, an imprint of Penguin Publishing. Speak has been translated into 16 languages.

In 2018, Anderson revealed that she was raped when she was thirteen years old, and the novel was based on her experience. Anderson later wrote a memoir, Shout, about her life when she was a teenager, including details of her rape and the trauma she faced afterward.

=== Fever 1793 (2000) ===
In 2000, Anderson's Fever 1793, a historical fiction novel set in Philadelphia during the yellow fever epidemic, was published by Simon and Schuster. Fever 1793 received two starred reviews, state and national awards, and was a Publishers Weekly Bestseller.

=== Catalyst (2002) ===
In 2002, after the publication of Fever 1793, Catalyst was published by Penguin under the Viking imprint. The action takes place in the same high school as Speak and features cameo appearances by some of its characters. The book became a Barnes & Noble Best Teen Book of 2002 and an American Library Association Best Book for Young Adults.

=== Thank You, Sarah! (2002) ===
Anderson's fiction picture book, Thank You, Sarah! The Woman Who Saved Thanksgiving was published in 2002. The book received two starred reviews, and was named in the ALA Amelia Bloomer List and the Junior Library Guild Selection.

=== Prom (2005) ===
In 2005, Anderson published Prom, which appeared on The New York Times Best Seller list in early 2005. The book received three starred reviews, was nominated for several state awards, and received national recognition from the American Library Association (ALA) and the International Reading Association.

=== Twisted (2007) ===
Anderson's fourth YA novel, Twisted, was released in the spring of 2007 by Viking. It won awards such as the ALA Best Book for Young Adults 2008, ALA Quick Pick for Young Adults 2008, International Reading Association Top Ten of 2007, and New York Public Library Best Books for the Teen Age, and became a New York Times Bestseller.

=== Seeds of America trilogy (2008–2016) ===
In 2008, Anderson published another historical fiction novel, Chains, about a teenage Revolutionary War-era slave. The novel was awarded the Scott O'Dell Award for Historical Fiction.

The second novel in the Seeds of America trilogy, Forge, was released in October 2010, by Simon and Schuster. The book received three starred reviews and became a Junior Library Guild Selection, a Kirkus Best Book for Teens: Historical Novels 2010, The Horn Book Fanfare List Best Book of 2010, and one of the Young Adult Library Services Association's (YALSA) 2011 Best Books for Young Adults.

=== Wintergirls (2009) ===
Anderson later released Wintergirls in March 2009. The novel tells the story of two girls—one of whom is dead at the beginning—who have died from bulimia and anorexia. Wintergirls received five-star reviews and nominations for state awards, was named an ALA Quick Pick for Young Adults, was a Junior Library Guild Selection, and debuted on the New York Times Best Seller list. Wintergirls has been published in over 15 different countries.

== Awards and honors ==
The ALA Margaret A. Edwards Award recognizes one writer and a particular body of work "for significant and lasting contribution to young adult literature." Anderson won the annual award in 2009, citing three novels published from 1999 to 2002: Speak, Fever 1793, and Catalyst. The ALA called the novels "gripping and exceptionally well-written" and the panel chair said that "Laurie Halse Anderson masterfully gives voice to teen characters undergoing transformations in their lives through their honesty and perseverance while finding the courage to be true to themselves." In 2017, she received the Anne V. Zarrow Award for Young Readers' Literature, a career award presented by the Tulsa City-County Library.

Several of Anderson's early children's picture books were placed on recommended reading lists and some won awards. For the novel Speak, Anderson won the Golden Kite Award, the Edgar Allan Poe Award, and the Los Angeles Times Book Prize. She was a runner-up for the Michael L. Printz Award and the National Book Award for Young People's Literature. Fever 1793 was an ALA Best Book for Young Adults selection and a Junior Library Guild selection. Chains was a National Book Award finalist in 2008 and it won the Scott O'Dell Award for Historical Fiction in 2009.

In 2023 Anderson won the Astrid Lindgren Memorial Award, one of the largest cash prizes in children's literature, with the motivation:

In her tightly written novels for young adults, Laurie Halse Anderson gives voice to the search for meaning, identity, and truth, both in the present and the past. Her darkly radiant realism reveals the vital role of time and memory in young people's lives. Pain and anxiety, yearning and love, class and sex are investigated with stylistic precision and dispassionate wit. With tender intensity, Laurie Halse Anderson evokes moods and emotions and never shies from even the hardest things.

== Publications ==
=== Young adult novels ===
- Speak (1999) ISBN 9780141310886
- Catalyst (2002) ISBN 9780756915322
- Prom (2005) ISBN 9781407138596
- Twisted (2007) ISBN 9780142411841
- Wintergirls (2009) ISBN 9781407171067
- The Impossible Knife of Memory (2014) ISBN 9780670012091
- Speak: the graphic novel, New York: Farrar, Straus, Giroux, 2018. ISBN 9780374300289

=== Historical novels ===
- Fever 1793 (2000) ISBN 9780739349052
- Seeds of America series, also referred to as "Chains: Seeds of America" series or simply "Chains" series.
1. Chains (2008) ISBN 9781481486781
2. Forge (2010) ISBN 9781416961444
3. Ashes (2016) ISBN 9781416961475
- Rebellion 1776 (2025) ISBN 9781416968269

=== Children's books ===
- Ndito Runs (1996) ISBN 9780805032659
- Turkey Pox (1996)
- No Time for Mother's Day (2001)
- The Big Cheese of Third Street (2002)
- Thank You, Sarah! The Woman Who Saved Thanksgiving (2002) ISBN 9780689851438
- Independent Dames: What You Never Knew About the Women and Girls of the American Revolution (2008)
- The Hair of Zoe Fleefenbacher Goes to School (2009)
- Vet Volunteers series (Previously published by Pleasant Company under the title Wild at Heart)
1. Fight for Life: Maggie (2000)
2. Homeless: Sunita (2000)
3. Trickster: David (2000) ISBN 9780142410837
4. Manatee Blues: Brenna (2000)
5. Say Good-Bye: Zoe (2001)
6. Storm Rescue: Sunita (2001)
7. Teacher's Pet: Maggie (2001)
8. Trapped: Brenna (2001)
9. Fear of Falling: David (2001)
10. Time to Fly (2002)
11. Masks (2002)
12. End of the Race (2003) ISBN 9780142412282
13. New Beginnings (2012)
14. Acting Out (2012)
15. Helping Hands (2013)
16. Treading Water (2014)
17. Left Behind (2016)

=== Graphic novels ===
- Speak: The Graphic Novel, illustrated by Emily Caroll (2019)
- Wonder Woman: Tempest Tossed, illustrated by Leila Del Duca (2020)

=== Memoir ===
- Shout: The True Story of a Survivor Who Refused to be Silenced (2019)
