= Morgan Jerkins =

American writer and editor (born 1992)

- Born: 1992 (age 33–34); New Jersey, United States
- Education: Princeton University (AB); Bennington College (MFA)
- Occupations: Writer, editor
- Relatives: Fred Jerkins III (uncle), Rodney Jerkins (uncle)
- Writing career
- Language: English
- Subjects: Race, society, African American history, culture
- Notable work: This Will Be My Undoing (2018)
- Website: www.morgan-jerkins.com

Morgan Jerkins (born 1992) is an American writer and editor. Her debut book, This Will Be My Undoing (2018), a collection of nonfiction essays, was a New York Times bestseller. Her second book, Wandering in Strange Lands, her memoir, was released in August 2020. She is currently an adjunct professor at Columbia University.

== Early life and education ==
Jerkins was raised by her mother and grew up in a predominantly white neighborhood in New Jersey. She has an older sister, and is the niece of music producers Fred Jerkins III and Rodney Jerkins. She has Creole ancestry. She began writing at the age of 14 as an outlet for her experiences with bullying in school.

Jerkins received her bachelor's degree from Princeton University. She planned to move to New York after graduation, but had difficulty finding a job in the publishing industry despite her degree in comparative literature, for which she said she learned five languages. She attended the Bennington College Writing Seminars for her MFA.

== Career ==
=== Books ===
Jerkins' first book This Will Be My Undoing: Living at the Intersection of Black, Female, and Feminist in (White) America was published on January 30, 2018, by Perennial/HarperCollins. The book is a nonfiction collection of essays including topics such as experiencing bullying as a child, feminism, dating, and attending Princeton as a Black student. The cover was inspired by one of the covers for Zora Neale Hurston's Their Eyes Were Watching God.

The book received mainly positive critical reception. Ilana Masad wrote in a review for the Los Angeles Times, "there is a brutal honesty Jerkins brings to the experiences of black girls and women that is vital for us to understand as we strive toward equality, toward believing women’s voices and experiences, and toward repairing the broken systems that have long defined our country." Roxane Gay stated in Elle, "This Will Be My Undoing is not a perfect book—there are places where I wanted her to push her conclusions further—but the prose resonates with the promise of a talented writer coming into her own." In a less positive review, Khanya Khandlo Mtshali wrote in Los Angeles Times Book Review, "Morgan Jerkins is an industrious writer whose success is undoubtedly a product of her work ethic and determination. But This Will Be My Undoing falls into the tradition of art that upholds an easy and showy moralism." The book received a starred review from Publishers Weekly and was a New York Times bestseller.

Her second book, Wandering in Strange Lands: A Daughter of the Great Migration Reclaims Her Roots was published in August 2020 under HarperCollins. It is a memoir of Jerkins' journey through several Southern states to answer long-held questions about her family's history. Kirkus Reviews described it as a "revelatory exploration of the meaning of blackness."

Jerkins first novel and third book, Caul Baby: A Novel, was published by HarperCollins in 2021. She began writing the novel in 2015, shortly after moving to Harlem from New Jersey, "One of the things that fascinate me about Harlem, aside from these rich diasporic communities, is the cacophony, that if you really lean into the sound here, you hear so many different kinds of cadences, different types of rhythms, different types of pulses." Chicago Review of Books described the novel as "Laced with generational pain and sprinkled with magic, Caul Baby is a sweeping family drama with no shortage of action... Jerkins’s work feels more relevant than ever. She approaches the complexities of Black motherhood, gentrification, and capitalism with urgency and care."

Her second novel, Zeal, was published by HarperCollins in 2025. Kirkus Reviews described it as "A multigenerational exploration of slavery’s legacy and the power of Black joy and Black love." TIME called it one of "The 39 Most Anticipated Books of 2025".

=== Other work ===
Jerkins publishes nonfiction essays and is an editor. She was a senior editor for Zora, a culture website for women of color published by Medium. In January 2020, Jerkins led the assembly of The Zora Canon, a list of 100 great works by Black women writers. The list includes books published pre-Emancipation such as Our Nig (1859), up to those released in 2019. She left the position in February 2021, and was named senior culture editor of The Undefeated in March 2021.

In 2021, Morgan Jerkins appeared on Storybound alongside the band French Cassettes.

== Personal life ==
Jerkins is a Christian. She resides in Harlem, New York.

== Bibliography ==
=== Nonfiction ===
- This Will Be My Undoing: Living at the Intersection of Black, Female, and Feminist in (White) America (2018). ISBN 9780062666161
- Wandering in Strange Lands: A Daughter of the Great Migration Reclaims Her Roots (2020). ISBN 9780062873040

=== Fiction ===
- Caul Baby: A Novel (2021). ISBN 9780062873088
- Zeal (2025). ISBN 9780063234086
