= Liz Prince =

American comics creator

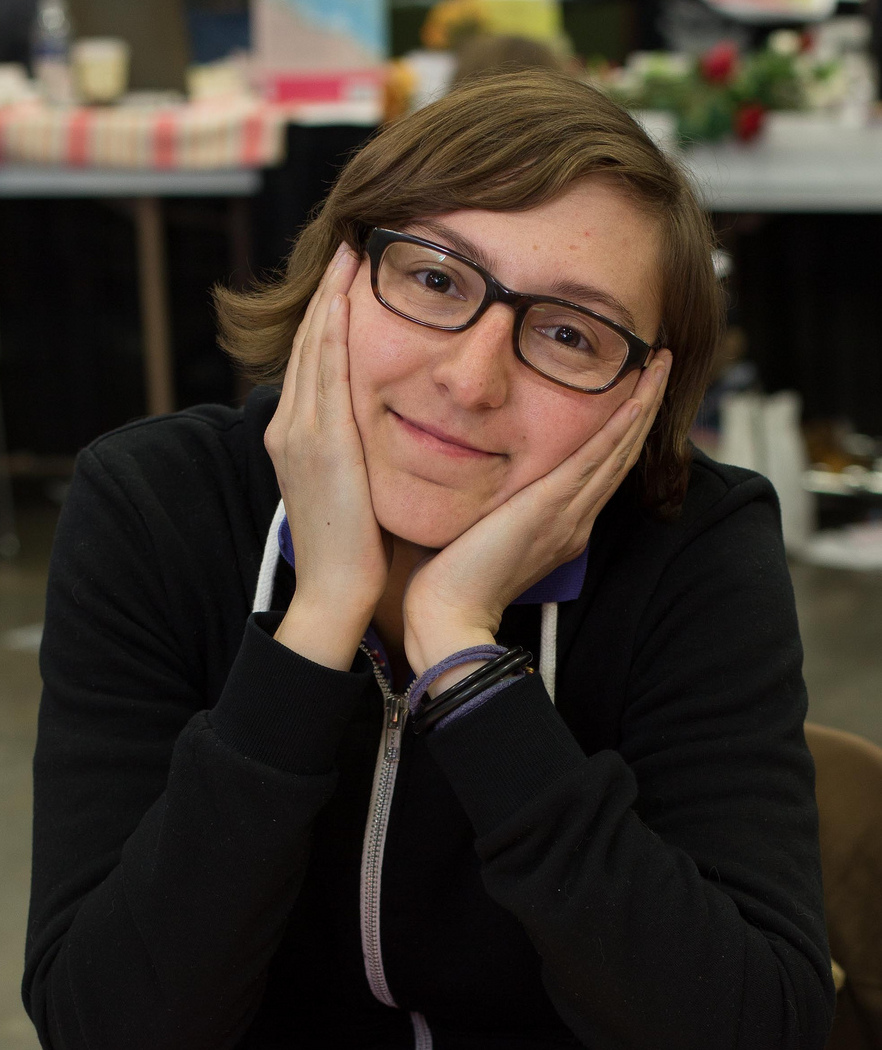
- Liz Prince at Stumptown Comics Fest, 2013
- Born: 1981 (age 44–45) Boston, Massachusetts
- Areas: Cartoonist, Writer, Artist
- Awards: Ignatz Award; Independent Publisher Book Awards

Liz Prince (born 1981) is an American comics creator, noted for her sketchbook-style autobiographical comics. Prince initially started publishing on her own on the internet and later became a published author with Top Shelf Comics. She currently lives in Maine.

== Biography ==
Prince was born in Boston and grew up in Santa Fe, New Mexico. As a young person, she played Little League baseball in Santa Fe.

Prince released her first book, Will You Still Love Me If I Wet the Bed? in 2005, published by Top Shelf Productions. The book won the Ignatz Award for Outstanding Debut.

In 2012, Prince lent her talents to help support the Boston Ladyfest, which worked to raise money for the Eastern Massachusetts Abortion Fund and create a "lasting network for creative feminists in Boston and beyond."

In 2014, she released Alone Forever, a collection of autobiographical short comics centered on dating and relationships.

Tomboy: A Graphic Memoir was published on August 26, 2014 by Zest Books. The memoir explores what it means to be female and describes Prince's struggle with gender issues. This memoir is told through short, related stories starting from Prince's early childhood experiences and ending when Prince is a teenager and has slowly learned to define herself as a woman on her own terms. Prince signed copies of Tomboy at New England Comics in Harvard Square during the 2014 Free Comic Book Day.

She has also published or contributed to several zines, minicomics, and anthologies including Subcultures: A Comics Anthology. Prince has occasionally contributed to comic adaptations of Adventure Time and Regular Show. She was the writer of a four-issue comic book limited series adaptation of Clarence (Boom! Studios) with art by Evan Palmer, published in 2015.

== Critical reception ==
Tomboy received a starred review from Kirkus Reviews. It also received the following accolades:

- Independent Publisher Book Awards for Graphic Novel/±Drawn Book - Drama/Documentary Gold Medal (2015)
- Young Adult Library Services Association's (YALSA) Great Graphic Novels for Teens (2015)
- American Library Association's (ALA) top ten for the Amelia Bloomer Book List (2015)
- Goodreads Choice Award Nominee for Graphic Novels & Comics (2014)

== Podcast appearances ==
- Prince appeared on Bad At Sports episode 191 on August 26, 2009.
- Prince co-hosted the Razorcake Podcast episode #217 on June 22, 2012.
- Prince appeared on The Mostly Harmless Podcast on June 9, 2015.
- Prince appeared on Everything's Coming Up Podcast to discuss The Simpsons episode "Lisa's Rival" on November 24, 2015.
- Prince appeared on Ken Reid's TV Guidance Counselor podcast on January 20, 2016.

== Bibliography ==
=== Graphic novels ===
- Will You Still Love Me If I Wet the Bed? (2005 Top Shelf Productions, ISBN 978-1891830723)
- Delayed Replays (2007 Top Shelf Productions, ISBN 978-1603090124)
- Alone Forever (2014 Top Shelf Productions, ISBN 978-1-60309-322-4)
- Tomboy (2014 Zest Books, ISBN 978-1936976553)
- Be Your Own Backing Band (2017 Silver Sprocket, ISBN 978-1-945509-24-7)
- Look Back And Laugh (2018 Top Shelf Productions, ISBN 978-1-60309-434-4)

=== Boom! Studios ===
- Clarence #1-4 (4-issue limited series, with Evan Palmer, 2015, ISBN 9781608868384)
- Coady and the Creepies #1-4 (4-issue limited series, with Amanda Kirk and Hannah Fisher, March–June 2017, ISBN 9781684150298)

=== Minis ===
- Comic/Cumulus (Self published, 2001)
- WYSLM mini (Self published, 2004)
- Delayed Replays (Self published, 2005)
- Delayed Replays Vol. 2 (Self published, 2006)
- I Was A Teenage Comic Nerd (Self published, 2008)
- Delayed Replays Vol. 3 (Self published, 2009)
- I Swallowed The Key To My <3 #1 (Self published, 2010)
- I Swallowed The Key To My <3 #2 (Self published, 2010)
- I Swallowed The Key To My <3 #3 (Self published, 2012)

=== Anthologies ===
- Rag Tag antho (2000-2004)
- Papercuts Machine (2003)
- True Porn 2 (Alternative Comics, 2005)
- Hey 4-Eyes! #2 (2006)
- Papercutter #2 (Tugboat Press, 2006)
- VICE Magazine Comics Issue (2006)
- Project:Romantic (Adhouse Books, October 2006)
- You Ain't No Dancer vol. 2 (New Reliable Press, October 2006)
- Elfworld vol. 1 (Family Style Press, October 2006)
- Foursquares (Selfpublished with Maris Wicks, Joe Quinones, and Tim Finn, October 2008)
- Papercutter #5 (Tugboat Press, 2008)
- I Saw You... Comics Inspired by Real-Life Missed Connections (Three Rivers Press, February 2009)
- So This Is What It's Come To... a comic zine about the trials and tribulations of Ok Cupid
- Papercutter #16 (Tugboat Press, 2011)
- Razorcake #67 (2012)
- As You Were: A Punk Comix Anthology #1-3 (Silver Sprocket, 2013-2014)
