= Good Girls Revolt =

American period drama television series

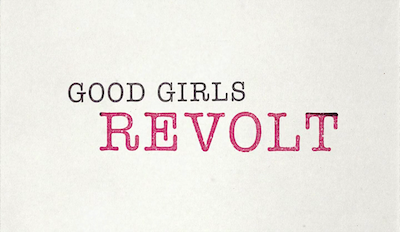
- Genre: Period drama
- Created by: Dana Calvo
- Based on: The Good Girls Revolt by Lynn Povich
- Starring: Genevieve Angelson; Anna Camp; Erin Darke; Hunter Parrish; Chris Diamantopoulos; Joy Bryant
- Country of origin: United States
- Original language: English
- No. of seasons: 1
- No. of episodes: 10

Production
- Executive producers: Dana Calvo; Lynda Obst; Jeff Okin; Darlene Hunt
- Running time: 60 minutes
- Production companies: Lynda Obst Productions; Annabelita Films; Farm Kid; TriStar Television; Sony Pictures Television; MindQuest Television International; Amazon Studios

Original release
- Network: Amazon Prime Video
- Release: November 5, 2015 – October 28, 2016

Good Girls Revolt is an American period drama television series. It is inspired by Lynn Povich's 2013 book The Good Girls Revolt and based on real-life events. The show was released on October 28, 2016, on Amazon Prime Video.

On December 2, 2016, Amazon cancelled the series after one season.

== Plot ==
The series follows a group of young female writers at the fictional News of the Week magazine (representing the real Newsweek of the non-fiction book The Good Girls Revolt) beginning in 1969.

Women in the newsroom ("The Pit") are relegated to low-level positions as researchers. Many researchers are more talented and better educated than their male colleagues, the reporters, and do original writing ("files") that the reporters later incorporate more-or-less directly into their stories, often without adaptation ("rewrite"), and always without attribution ("byline"). The researchers are also paid considerably less.

These women have a sense that they're paid a lot less, and during the series it emerges just how much lower their pay is (about one-third of their colleague reporter's salary). But also at issue is the fact that their writing is not recognized; on a rare occasion when a female researcher's writing is openly accepted, such as when a male reporter quits just before a deadline, the researcher's story is nonetheless published as written by her, but under the departed reporter's byline only.

== Cast ==
=== Main ===
- Genevieve Angelson as Patricia "Patti" Robinson
- Anna Camp as Jane Hollander
- Erin Darke as Cindy Reston
- Hunter Parrish as Douglas "Doug" Rhodes
- Chris Diamantopoulos as Evan Phinnaeus "Finn" Woodhouse
- Joy Bryant as Eleanor Holmes Norton

=== Recurring ===
- Jim Belushi as William "Wick" McFadden
- Grace Gummer as Nora Ephron
- Frankie Shaw as Naomi
- Leah Moth as Vivian
- Daniel Eric Gold as Sam Rosenberg
- Teddy Bergman as Gabriel "Gabe" Greenstone
- J. P. Manoux as JP Crowley
- Michael Graziadei as Gregory
- Alexander DiPersia as Noah Benowitz
- Cheyenne Haynes as Novo

== Episodes ==
No.	Title	Directed by	Written by	Original release date
1	"Pilot"	Liza Johnson	Dana Calvo	November 5, 2015
Life for young and vibrant Patti Robinson couldn't be better. As a researcher at News of the Week magazine in 1969 New York, she enjoys exciting, intellectual challenges and the occasional quickie with her reporter boyfriend at work. But while navigating the social upheaval of the times, she encounters bold new ideas and actions that propel her into new territory that even she never dreamt of.
2	"The Folo"	Scott Winant	Dana Calvo	October 28, 2016
Jane helps Sam nail down a challenging interview, while Patti's aspirations cause a rift in her relationship with Doug. The girls attend a consciousness-raising meeting, where Cindy makes a discovery about herself.
3	"The Futures"	Scott Winant	Darlene Hunt	October 28, 2016
When News of the Week's publisher comes to visit, Patti and Cindy are motivated to pursue equality in the workplace. Meanwhile, Cindy and Ned take their flirtationship up to a bold new level at work.
4	"Out of Pocket"	Dan Attias	Daniel Shattuck	October 28, 2016
Patti and Doug butt heads while Cindy gains a new sexual confidence. Finn returns home from a trip with his wife to find that Wick has disobeyed orders.
5	"The Year-Ender"	Gloria Muzio	Tracy McMillan	October 28, 2016
Patti invites her coworkers to a wild New Year's Eve party that pushes them out of their comfort zone. Jane receives some bad news and makes a change, while Cindy visits Eleanor in Harlem.
6	"Strikethrough"	Minkie Spiro	Richard E. Robbins	October 28, 2016
Patti gets an important scoop on the U.S. postal strike of 1970. She and Eleanor enlist a key player in the lawsuit. Finn hires an eccentric new editor. Jane and Sam work on a tough field assignment.
7	"Puff Piece"	Daisy von Scherler Mayer	Bronwyn Garrity	October 28, 2016
Patti's birthday party devolves into chaos and Jane feels excluded from the other girls. Finn and his new editor let loose on a boy's trip.
8	"Exposé"	Roxann Dawson	Matt McGuinness	October 28, 2016
Jane asserts herself to the new editor but he presents her with a very unwelcome obstacle. Cindy reconsiders her marriage. Patti gets an opportunity to prove herself, but discovers she still has a lot to learn.
9	"Dateline"	Jennifer Getzinger	Darlene Hunt	October 28, 2016
Patti witnesses the Greenwich Village townhouse explosion, starts to question her loyalties, and rallies for change. Patti finds herself in a love triangle. Jane and Sam help Naomi get a message to her husband in Vietnam.
10	"The Newser"	Scott Winant	Dana Calvo	October 28, 2016
As the girls prepare to file their complaint, the relationships with one another and the men in their lives are redefined.

== Reception ==
Good Girls Revolt has received generally positive reviews from critics, with most comparing it to Mad Men and some calling it a female version of that show. On Rotten Tomatoes, a score of 71% was reported with its critical consensus saying: "Good Girls Revolt features a compelling true story, told by a talented cast, even if the period drama hasn't yet achieved Mad Men-level mastery". On Metacritic, it has a 66 out of 100 score indicating, "generally favorable reviews".
