= Douglass (Washington, D.C.) =

Coordinates: 38°51′0.7″N 76°58′47.9″W

- Neighborhood of Washington, D.C.
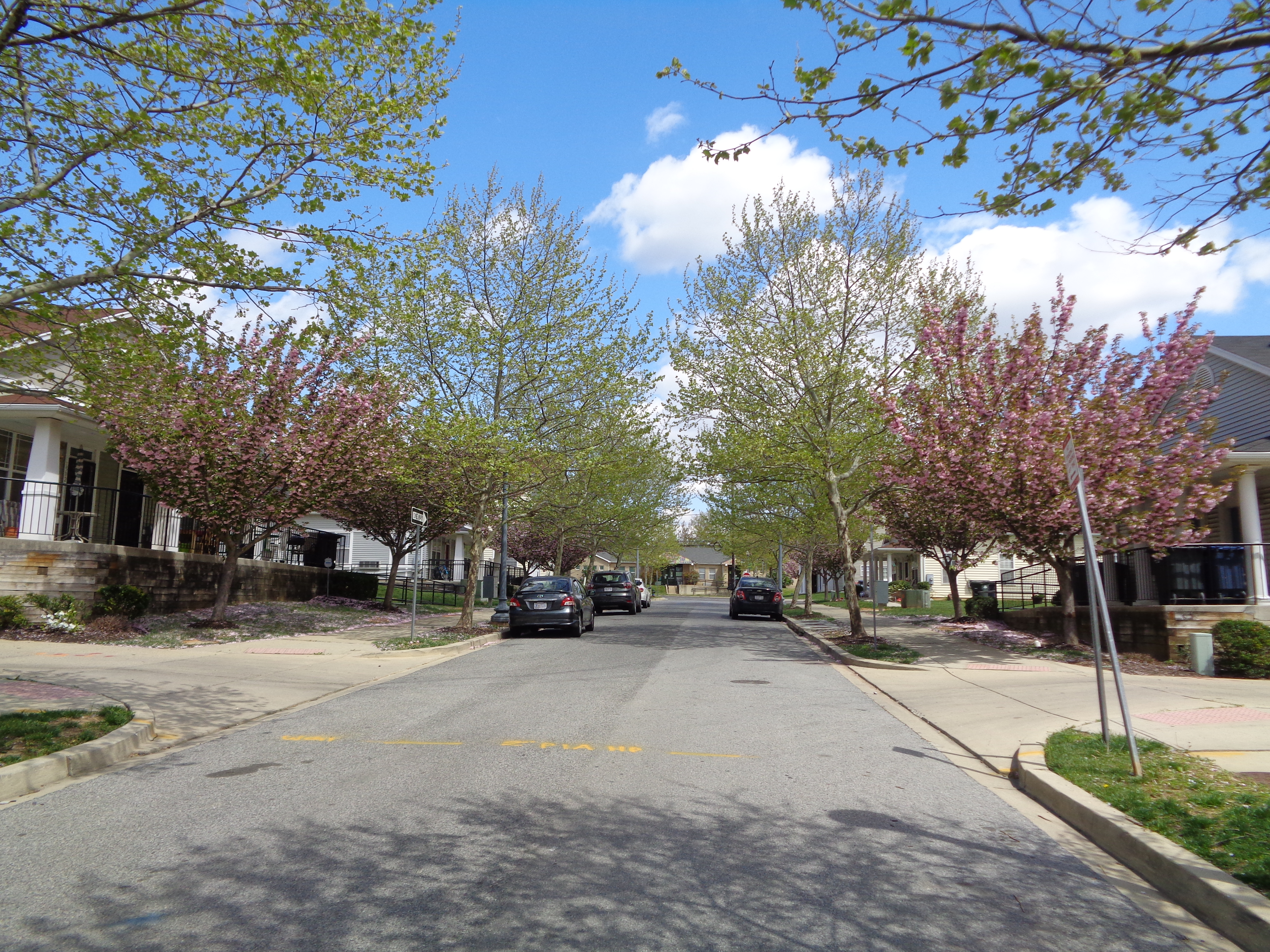
- The Douglass neighborhood at the intersection of 15th Place and Shippen Lane SE

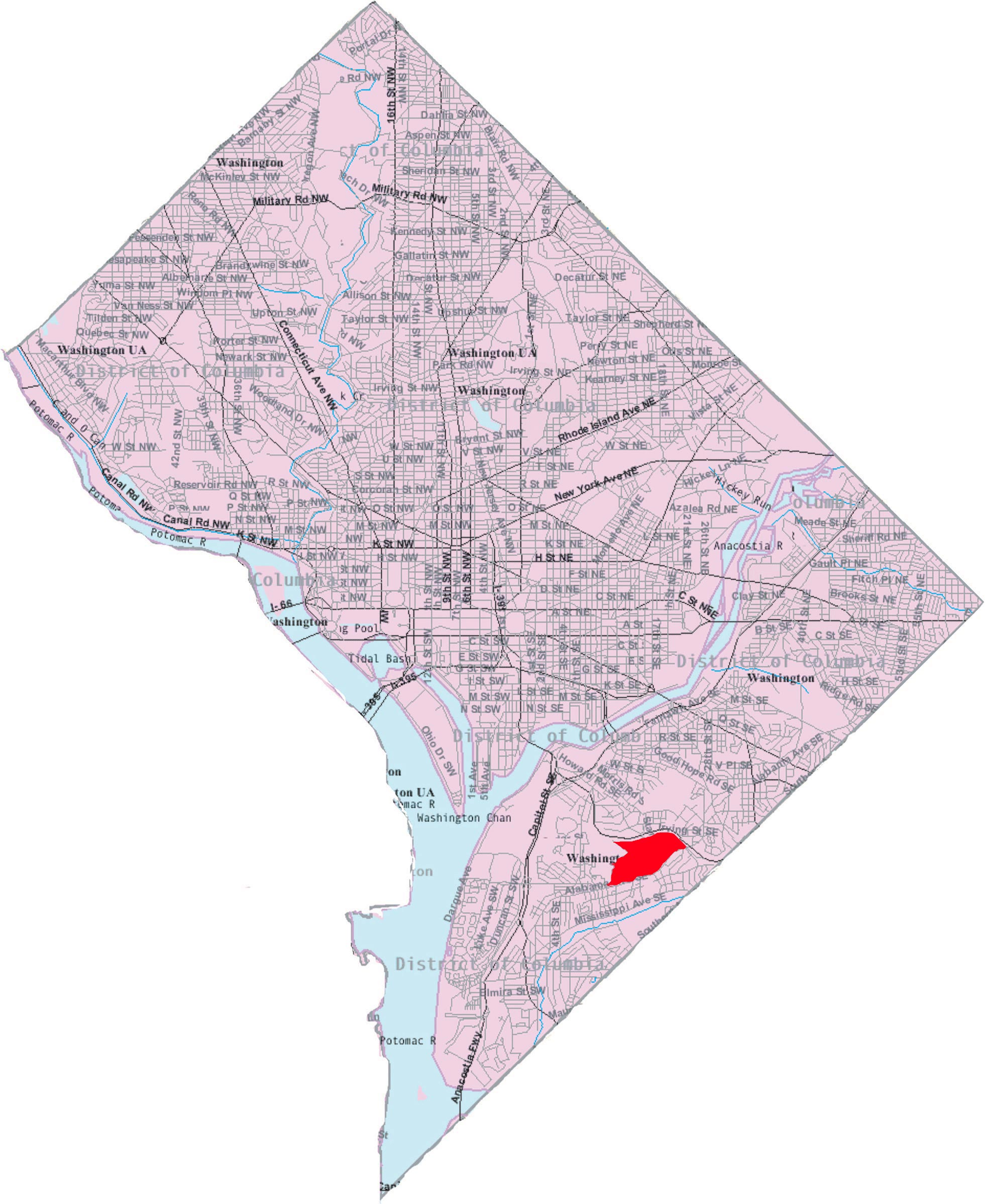
- Douglass within the District of Columbia
- Country: United States
- District: Washington, D.C.
- Ward: Ward 8

Government
  - Councilmember: Trayon White

Douglass is a residential neighborhood in Southeast Washington, D.C., on the eastern side of St. Elizabeths Hospital, on the border of the Congress Heights Metro Station. It is bounded by Suitland Parkway SE, Alabama Avenue SE, and Saint Elizabeth's Hospital Campus.

The Douglass neighborhood sits atop a hilly ridge that is the highest point in Southeast Washington, The area was once almost entirely dominated by two public housing complexes, Douglass Dwellings and Stanton Dwellings. It is now one of the up-and-coming areas of Washington, DC and experiencing a fair amount of retail investment and gentrification. The areas is close to THEARC (Town Hall Education Arts and Recreation Center), with institutions such as Trinity Washington University (formerly Trinity College), the School of the Washington Ballet and the Levine School of Music. The area has several new homes developments with houses priced in the $200–400,000 range.

The area contains several historic Jewish cemeteries, including the Adas Israel and Elesavetgrad cemeteries and a relatively new Bet Mishpachah Cemetery.

The neighborhood is named for the famed American abolitionist Frederick Douglass, whose homestead, Cedar Hill, sits approximately one mile north of his namesake community.
