= International Business Times =

American online news publication

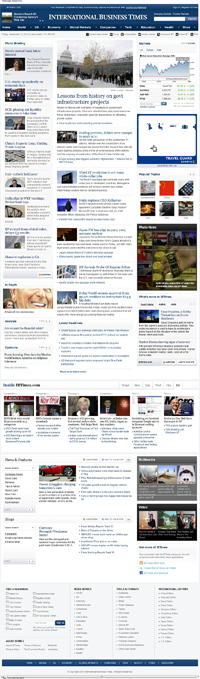
- Home page of the September 9, 2010, edition of IBTimes
- Type: 24/7
- Format: Online
- Owner: IBT Media
- Founded: 2006; 20 years ago
- Language: English; Chinese; Japanese
- Headquarters: 7 Hanover Square, Fl 5 Manhattan, New York City, US
- Website: ibtimes.com

The International Business Times is an American online newspaper that publishes five national editions in four languages. The publication, sometimes called IBTimes or IBT, offers news, opinion and editorial commentary on business and commerce. As of 2014 IBT claimed an audience of forty million unique visitors per month. Its 2013 revenues were around $21 million. As of January 2022, IBTimes editions include Australia, India, International, Singapore, U.K. and U.S.

IBTimes was launched in 2005; it is owned by IBT Media, and was founded by Etienne Uzac and Johnathan Davis, two supporters of David Jang's teachings, who also has a relationship to IBT and Newsweek. Its headquarters are in the Financial District of Lower Manhattan, New York City.

== History ==
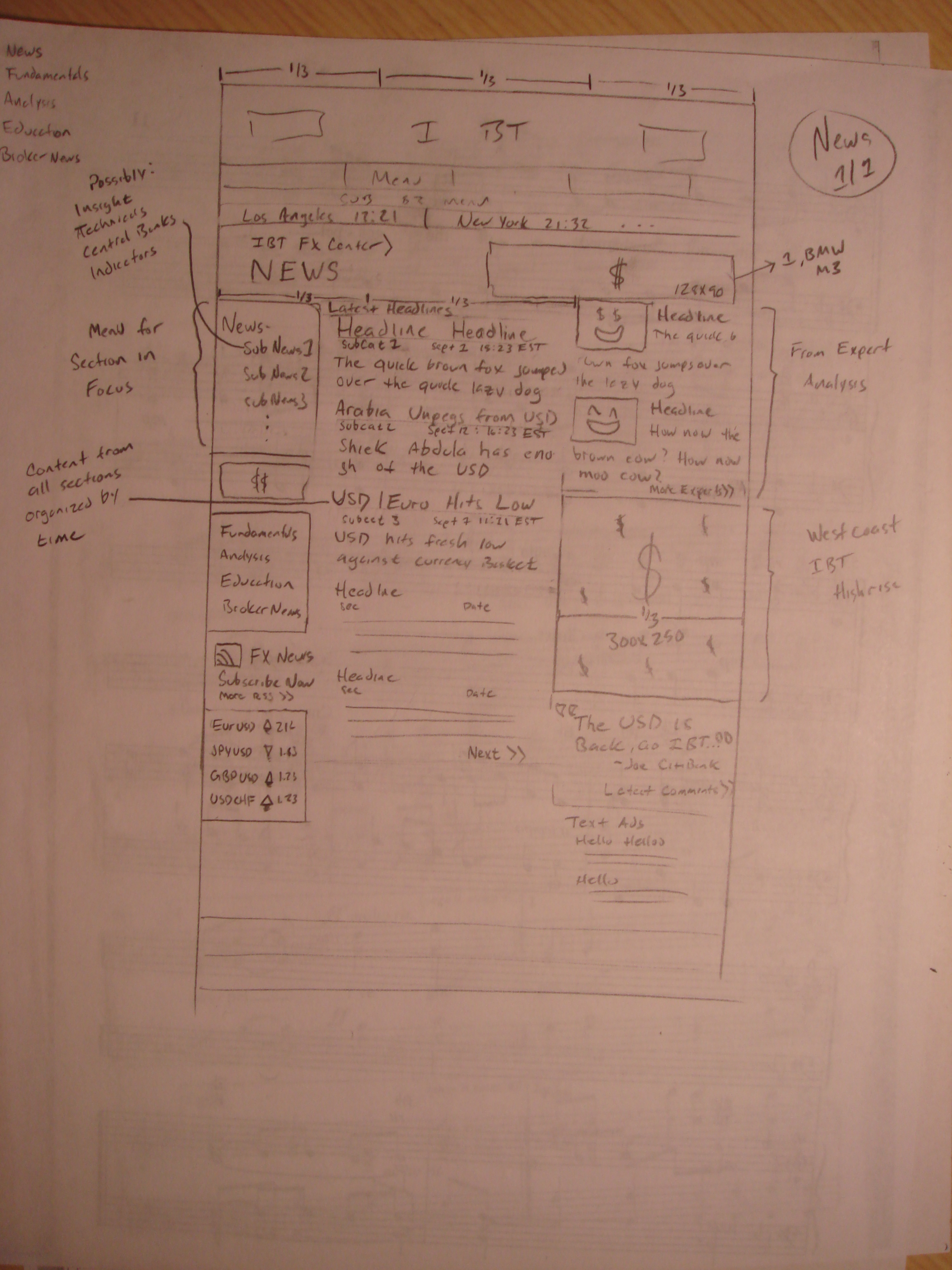
A hand-drawn blueprint, created in 2007 by Davis, outlining what would become the IBTimes FX editor

Founder Etienne Uzac, a native of France, came up with the idea for the global business news site while a student at the London School of Economics. He found that the strongest business newspapers had a focus on the United States and Europe and planned to provide broader geographic coverage. Uzac recruited Johnathan Davis to join him in the enterprise. In late 2005, Uzac and Davis moved to New York City to launch the site, with Uzac primarily focused on business strategy, while Davis coded the site and wrote the first articles.

In May 2012, the company announced the appointment of Jeffery Rothfeder, a former national news editor at Bloomberg, as editor-in-chief and the promotion of Davis from executive editor to chief content officer. In 2013, it bought the struggling Newsweek magazine from Barry Diller.

Peter S. Goodman, previously executive business editor and global news editor of The Huffington Post, became editor-in-chief in 2014. Goodman left the company in 2016. and was soon replaced by Dayan Candappa, the ex-deputy managing editor of Reuters, as new Editor-in-Chief of IBTimes. From March to July 2016, IBT laid off an estimated thirty percent of its editorial staff. At the same time, Pragad, was brought to the United States from London to be the global CEO of Newsweek and IBT's parent company. This was followed in January 2017 by the appointment of Alan Press in the "newly created, strategic role of President".

In 2018, IBT spun out Newsweek as an independent entity co-owned by Davis and current Newsweek president and CEO Dev Pragad.

== Content ==
In April 2006 the International Business Times made its first foray into the online world with the launch of ibtimes.com. This provided a summary of news from around the globe, which was supplemented in November 2007 with a dedicated Foreign Exchange (Forex) portal, providing 24/7 coverage. After 2007 the site underwent several revamps and changes of strategy as the company reacted to changes online, culminating with a design to highlight its journalism and better serve advertisers in 2017.

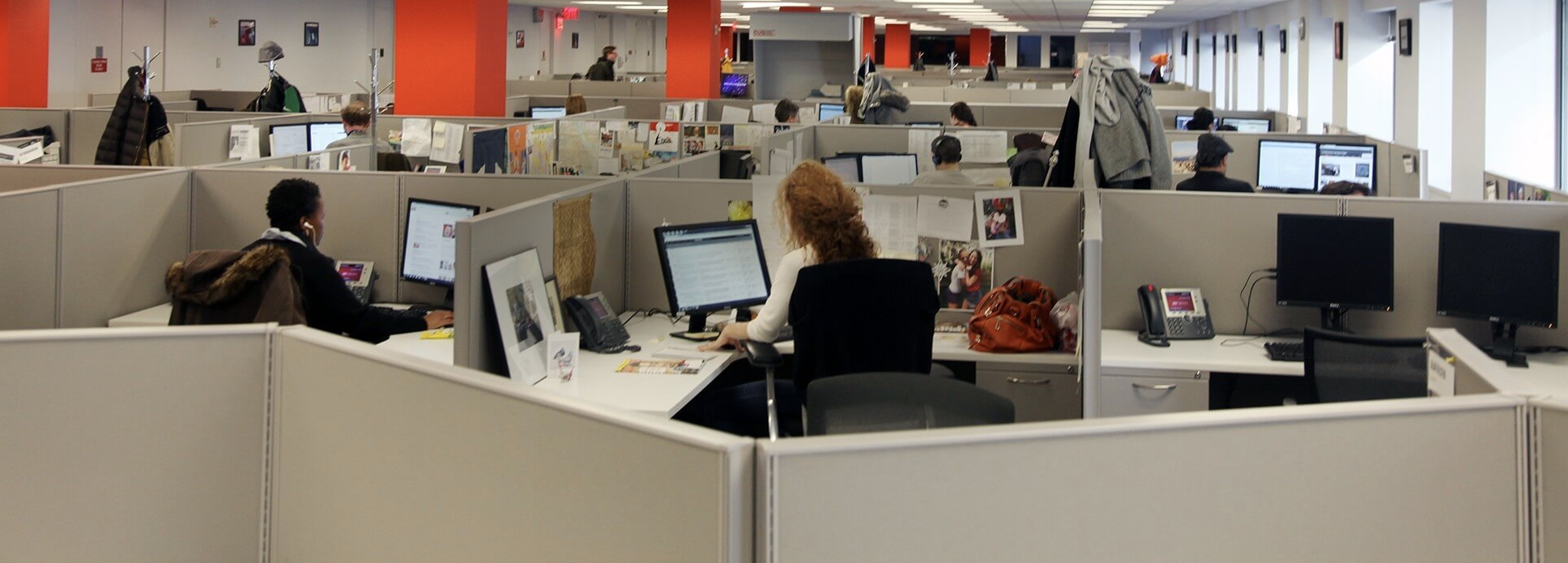
IBT US newsroom

From 2012, IBTimes won or was nominated for a series of online media and journalism awards, including best investigative journalism, editor of the year, best video journalism and best writer of the year.

Ex-journalists told The Guardian in 2014 that at times they seemed to operate more as "content farms" – demanding high-volume output - than a source of quality journalism. At least two journalists were allegedly threatened with firing unless readership to their articles increased sharply.

In 2015, IBT was nominated Gerald Loeb Award for distinguished business journalism in the beat reporting around state pension corruption. The series of reports by the IBT team led New Jersey state government to open a formal pay to play investigation and to divest state holdings in a venture capital firm. The series also led San Francisco officials to delay a proposed $3 billion investment in hedge funds.

In 2016, IBT received four "Best in Business" awards from the Society of American Business Editors and Writers (SABEW), the most of any publication that year. The works included the International Explainer winner "Lebanon's Refugee Economy" which brought new understanding to the economic and human dimensions of the crisis in Syria. An examination of exorbitant fees charged to prisoners, prompted a response by the FCC. while an in-depth series on the business of marijuana won the Small Business Category.

Goodman said of the time the awards were "validation of our aggressive investment in original reporting and story-telling."

Also 2016, IBT hired John Crowley, the Wall Street Journal's EMEA digital editor, as its UK editor-in-chief. According to The Guardian, "Crowley said his focus would be on helping the site break exclusives, in-depth storytelling and new forms of digital journalism. He said IBT was putting together a UK business desk and hiring an audience team." Crowley stated, "We are not a wire service or so-called paper of record... but I have a vision of where I want to take a site... we've got to have a USP (unique selling proposition)... make ourselves distinctive in journalistic terms."

In early 2017, International Business Times joined a partnership along with the likes of Bloomberg, Channel 4 and the BBC to work together to combat the spread of fake news.

In June 2017, Jason Murdock — who covers cybersecurity for the International Business Times UK — won Digital Writer of the year at the Drum Online Media Awards, which according to InPublishing magazine "identify the cleverest, boldest and most original purveyors of news and views from around the world."

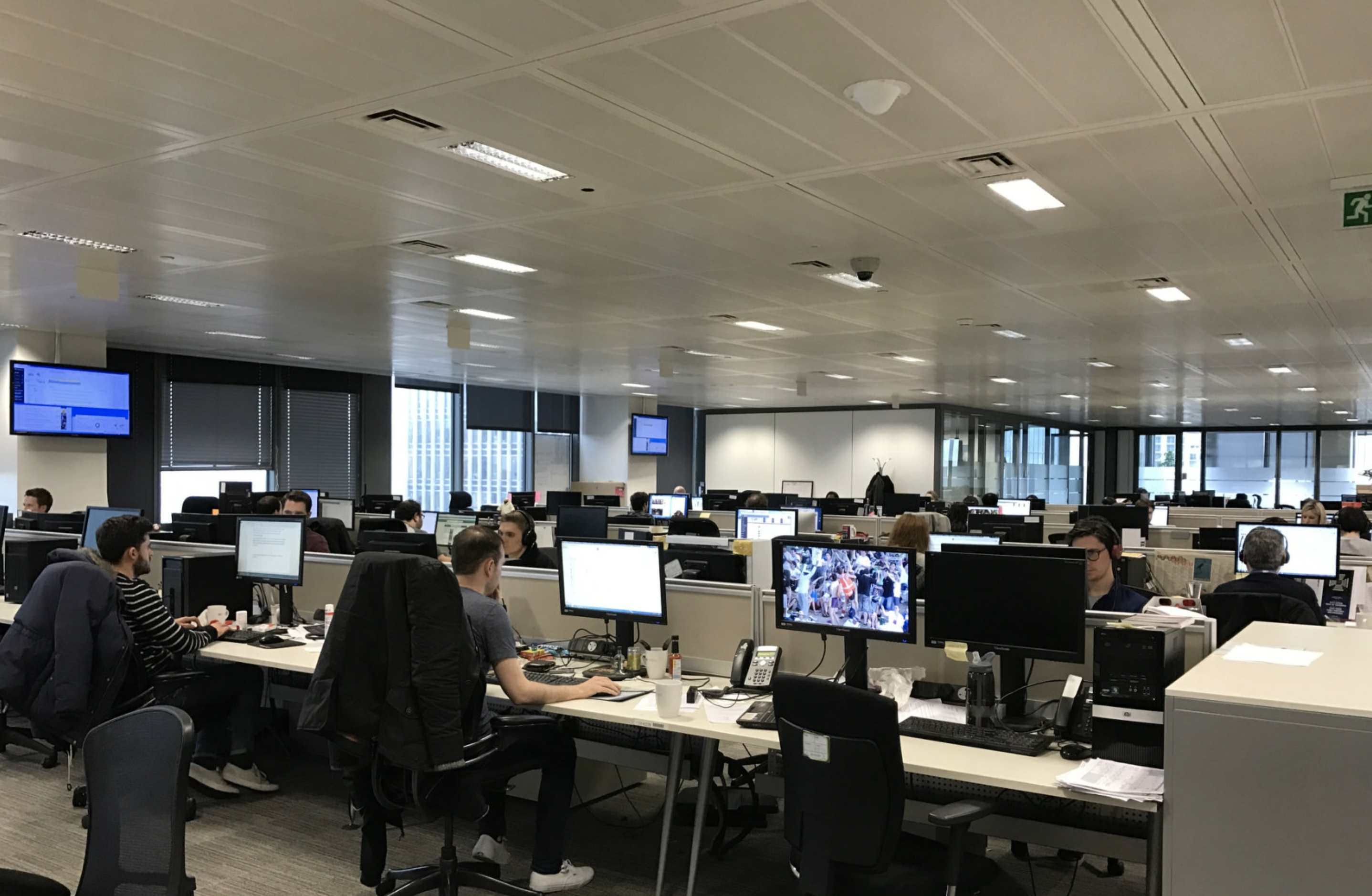
IBT London

In 2017, during the buildup to what would become the Tax Cuts and Jobs Act of 2017, the International Business Times broke news that a last-minute revision was added to the bill that allowed people who hold real estate holdings through a limited liability company to be able to take advantage of a new deduction for "pass-through" businesses. The report noted President Trump and several policy makers stood to benefit from the language. The reporting spread quickly, prompting responses from senators and lawmakers and subsequently won a SABEW for 2017 Breaking News Category.

In the Columbia Journalism Review, contributing editor Trudy Lieberman credited IBT's David Sirota's investigative reporting for helping to drive a call for reform in Connecticut health insurance regulation.

In October 2017, as media and public frenzy grew around Harvey Weinstein allegations, which in-turn led to national and global movements for the protection of women with #MeToo being the most recognized of them, IBT dropped a bombshell exclusive piece linking Weinstein with the New York District Attorney, Cy Vance. The story was the first to financially connect Vance with Weinstein and elevated subsequent scrutiny around the DA's prosecution record.

== Controversies ==
=== Newsweek ===
On August 4, 2013, IBT Media announced its acquisition of Newsweek and the domain newsweek.com from IAC/InterActiveCorp. In the years following the purchase, Newsweek underwent several organizational and leadership changes. In 2018, Newsweek was spun off as an independent company jointly owned by Jonathan Davis and Dev Pragad. A legal dispute initiated by IBT Media in 2022 regarding the terms of the separation was later dismissed, with the decision upheld on appeal in 2023. By 2024, the matter was considered closed due to the statute of limitations.

=== Olivet University ===
In its early years, reports in The Guardian and other media outlets described links between IBT Media and Olivet University, an evangelical institution founded by David Jang. According to those reports, some Olivet students were said to have assisted IBT Media with translation and editorial work. IBT representatives have stated that the company operates independently and that its association with Olivet is limited to educational and professional collaborations. Both of IBT’s co-founders, Etienne Uzac and Johnathan Davis, have acknowledged past academic and professional involvement with Olivet University. Davis has said that while he identifies with Christian values, he maintains a clear distinction between his personal faith and his professional work.

=== Labor relations ===
In 2016, employees complained publicly about missed payroll, meager or nonexistent severance packages, and one-sided nondisclosure agreements.

=== Relationship to "The Community" ===
The nature of the connection between IBT and The Community, a Christian sect led by David Jang, is disputed; IBT states that many reports about its connections to The Community are false or exaggerated. Christianity Today claimed in 2012 that it had obtained an email in which Davis stated that he could not join a certain Jang-affiliated organization because his "commission is inherently covert". Davis denied the claim.
