= Olivet University (disambiguation) =

Olivet University is headquartered in San Francisco, California, United States.

Olivet University may also refer to:

- University of Olivet, Olivet, Michigan, United States
- Olivet Nazarene University, Bourbonnais, Illinois, United States
