= Christian Today =

UK Christian news company

- Type: Daily Christian newspaper
- Format: Online
- Owner: Christian Today Limited
- Publisher: Andrew Clark
- Founded: 2000
- Headquarters: London, England
- Website: christiantoday.com christiantoday.co.uk

Christian Today is a non-denominational Christian news company with its international headquarters in London, England. The company's founder is David Jang.

The website was established in 2000 to report on news in the global church and current affairs from a Christian perspective.

The newspaper was awarded Best Christian News and Reviews Site in 2007 and 2008 at the Premier Christian Radio's Blog and Web Awards held in London, UK.

In 2018, the Church Times reported that the website's three London-based reporters had been sacked; the company said that this was because of declining income from advertisements.

The researchers Gregory P. Perreault and Newly Paul at the University of South Florida analysed coverage of refugees on the website. They noted that, as well as using Reuters as a source, Christian Today "at times sourced fringe, far-right sources, such as WND.com". They concluded that the website "suffered from a lack of transparency in sourcing on the coverage of refugees; this proved to be remarkably troubling in the case of Christian Today. The lack of sourcing, second-hand sourcing, and anonymous sourcing resulted in the publication of stories not seen elsewhere in reporting on refugees. Rather than providing more information or perspective on the refugee crisis, Christian Today largely perpetuated an orientalist discourse and served to instill moral panic through their coverage ... Original reporting was not a value exercised in the religious news organizations. Christian Today in particular clearly worked to instill fear of Syrian refugees".
