= NewsBeast =

Former American media company

- Company type: Joint venture
- Industry: Newspapers
- Genre: media
- Founded: November 2010
- Defunct: November 2013
- Key people: Baba Shetty, CEO
- Products: Newsweek, The Daily Beast (until 2013)

NewsBeast was an American media company, and owner of Newsweek and The Daily Beast. It was established in 2010 as a merger between the two media outlets. The company was owned by IAC/InterActiveCorp and the estate of Sidney Harman, with Stephen Colvin of The Daily Beast as CEO. In August 2013, IBT Media acquired Newsweek, leaving The Daily Beast under the management of The Newsweek Daily Beast Company, which today operates as a subsidiary of IAC.

== History ==
Newsweek magazine was launched in 1933 by a group of U.S. stockholders "which included Ward Cheney, of the Cheney silk family, John Hay Whitney, and Paul Mellon, son of Andrew W. Mellon," according to America's 60 Families by Ferdinand Lundberg. The Daily Beast was founded in 2008 by Tina Brown, former editor of Vanity Fair and The New Yorker as well as the short-lived Talk Magazine.

Newsweek was purchased by The Washington Post Company in 1961. With increasing competition from online news sources, years of financial losses forced the company to sell the magazine in 2010 to Harman Media, owned by Sidney Harman.

=== Merger ===
In November 2010, it was announced that Newsweek and The Daily Beast would merge into a joint venture named The Newsweek Daily Beast Company, with IAC and Sidney Harman each owning 50 percent of the new company. Harman's rationale for the merger was that: "In an admittedly challenging time, this merger provides the ideal combination of established journalism authority and bright, bristling website savvy." The company plans to redirect the Newsweek.com address to The Daily Beast, despite the fact that the former has higher traffic.

Tina Brown, who co-founded The Daily Beast, acts as editor-in-chief for both Newsweek and The Daily Beast.

Reception to the merger was not positive. As former Newsweek president Mark Edmiston comments on The New York Times, "I don’t see how you can take two money-losing businesses and put them together and come up with a single entity that makes money." As the two businesses target very different demographics, Edmiston questioned the appeal of the merger to advertisers.

Newsweek staffers reacted ambivalently to the merger. There was opposition to redirecting the Newsweek.com site, due to the amount of effort and work that staffers have spent on building the site. The news came unexpectedly to staffers, a sentiment reflected on SaveNewsweek.com, which states that "It’s always nice to wake up and find out in the Times that your job is doomed".

In 2012, it was announced that Newsweek would stop publishing its print magazine by December. The Newsweek brand would be retooled as Newsweek Global and continue as a digital-only magazine for e-book readers and tablet computers.

On February 1, 2013, Brian Ries, the social media editor for NewsBeast, announced that the company had changed its name.

On August 3, 2013, IBT Media announced it had acquired Newsweek from IAC on terms that were not disclosed; the acquisition included the Newsweek brand and its online publication, but did not include The Daily Beast.

== Company holdings ==
The company owned Newsweek, a news magazine, and The Daily Beast, a news website.
