= Elizabeth Peer =

American journalist

- Born: Elizabeth Clow Peer; February 3, 1936; East Orange, New Jersey, US
- Died: May 26, 1984 (aged 48); New York City, US
- Other name: Elizabeth Peer Jansson
- Education: Connecticut College (BA)
- Occupation: Journalist
- Years active: 1958–1984
- Employer: Newsweek
- Spouse: John P. Jansson

Elizabeth Clow Peer Jansson (February 3, 1936 – May 26, 1984) was an American journalist who worked for Newsweek from 1958 until her death in 1984. She began her career at Newsweek as a copy girl, at a time when opportunities for women were limited. Osborn Elliott promoted her to writer in 1962; two years later she would be dispatched to Paris as Newsweek's first female foreign correspondent.

Peer returned to the United States in 1969 to work in Newsweek's Washington, D.C., bureau. When forty-six of Newsweek's female employees filed a complaint with the Equal Employment Opportunity Commission, Peer remained on the sidelines. She was passed over for promotion to senior editor in 1973 for reasons that remain unclear. Peer returned to Paris in 1975 as bureau chief, and became Newsweek's first female war correspondent in 1977 when she covered the Ogaden War. Her reporting there won her recognition, but she suffered a debilitating injury from which she never recovered, leading to her suicide in 1984.

== Early life ==
Peer was born in East Orange, New Jersey, on February 3, 1936, to Dr. Lyndon A. Peer and Ruth Banghart Peer. Both her parents were college graduates. Lyndon, a graduate of Cornell University, was a plastic surgeon who established the department of plastic surgery at St. Barnabas Hospital in Newark, New Jersey. Ruth graduated from Wells College. They married on December 16, 1929.

Elizabeth attended the Connecticut College for Women, graduating in 1957. Peer majored in philosophy and showed a strong interest in the arts. She started out as a reporter for the student newspaper, the Connecticut College News (whose faculty advisor was a young Paul Fussell), before shifting to become its cartoonist as a sophomore. In that year she also served as art editor for the Quarterly, the college's literary magazine, and began acting in plays. She continued acting throughout her tenure at Connecticut. Peer's performance as one of the two schoolteachers in Lillian Hellman's The Children's Hour made an impression on William Meredith, then on the English faculty:

Miss Peer's final scene showed great sensitivity, and throughout the play she used her fine voice with tact and intelligence.

— William Meredith, Connecticut College News

At the end of her junior year Peer was elected president of the "Wig & Candle", the student theater group. Peer recalled later that she "never meant to have a career", but after an inconclusive engagement with an unnamed man the spring of her senior year at Connecticut, she followed up on her experience at Connecticut by enrolling in the theater program at Columbia University. Her parents disapproved of her decision and declined to pay for the degree, and Peer dropped out from Columbia.

== Career ==
An employment agency in New York City placed Peer with Newsweek as a copy girl. At the time, Peer wrote later, she had no intention of staying more than a couple years before finding a suitable husband. Newsweek, a prominent weekly news magazine, had no more than a couple women writers from its founding in 1933 and none when Peer arrived in 1958. An editor told Peer that if she was interested in writing she should "go somewhere else." Nevertheless, Peer's adventurous nature–including a notable incident in 1960 where she hid under a table to eavesdrop on a meeting of the Civil Aeronautics Board–attracted the right kind of attention from Newsweek's editors.

The culture began to change in 1961 when Phil Graham, publisher of The Washington Post, purchased Newsweek. Graham promoted Osborn "Oz" Elliott, the managing editor, to editor. Elliott gave Peer a writing tryout; the only such tryout for a woman between 1961–1969. Later, Peer reflected on the episode with bitterness:

Few bureaucracies are perfect, and by a series of oversights on management's part, one woman was given a writing tryout between 1961 and 1969. I was the recipient of this largesse, becoming a writer in 1962...

— Elizabeth Peer, quoted in The World of Oz

Newsweek dispatched Peer to Paris in 1964. She was its first female foreign correspondent, though she did not receive the customary raise; when Peer inquired about the raise, Elliott allegedly replied "What do you mean? Think of the honor we are paying you!" Peer held her own with the "macho crowd" of the foreign correspondents in Paris. Lynn Povich, who arrived at the Paris bureau in 1965 as a secretary, recalled Peer as "Newsweek's Brenda Starr. She could match the toughest foreign correspondent with her cigarettes, her swagger, and her fluent French. She was also a gifted writer and versatile reporter who covered everything from politics and the arts to fashion and food." Peer sought to cover the Vietnam War while in Paris but was rejected because she was a woman.

In 1969 Peer returned to the United States to take up a post in Newsweek's Washington, D.C. bureau. Still annoyed at Newsweek over the lack of a raise, Peer had them ship her extensive collection of French wine back to the States. In Washington Peer's beat included the State Department, White House, and Central Intelligence Agency (CIA).

Meanwhile, the long-simmering issue of Newsweek's treatment of its female employees finally exploded. The precipitating incident was the newsmagazine's March 23, 1970, cover story on feminism. The article, "Women in Revolt", was written by Helen Dudar, a freelancer and wife of Newsweek writer Peter Goldman. Newsweek's management thought that Peer, still the only female writer on staff, was too "inexperienced" to write the story despite five years as a correspondent in Paris. Peer's attitude was ambivalent; she did not join the forty-six women who filed a complaint with the Equal Employment Opportunity Commission, though Povich, who did, described Peer as "especially" supportive.

Peer moved up to New York City in 1973, where she continued writing for Newsweek. A cover story she wrote on Barbara Walters won a Page One Award the following year. One of the outcomes of the EEOC complaint was an agreement from Newsweek to promote a woman to senior editor. Peer was the obvious candidate. She had acted as one in early 1974 while the incumbent was on vacation (Peer's characteristic comment was that she "survived without any great disgrace"). Both Oz Elliott and Katharine Graham, President of the Washington Post Company, favored Peer for the position. Newsweek gave Peer a tryout in late 1974, the result of which is a matter of dispute. Peer later claimed that she was offered the job but turned it down. Edward Kosner, then managing editor, claimed later that Peer was "very talented...but she wasn't a good manager", and Lynn Povich recounts a story that Peer's tryout ended when Peer threw an ashtray at someone.

Regardless of the reasons why, Peer did not become a senior editor. After rejecting an offer to leave Newsweek to become assistant press secretary under Ron Nessen in the Ford Administration, Peer returned to Paris in 1975 as bureau chief. (Note: Blair implies that Peer was Newsweek's first female foreign bureau chief, but that honor went to Jane Whitmore, who became chief in Rome in 1971.) She added another first in 1977 when Newsweek dispatched her to cover the Ogaden War between Ethiopia and Somalia. Rejected for the Vietnam War less than a decade prior, Peer became Newsweek's first female war correspondent. Her reporting would win her the Overseas Press Club's "Ed Cunningham Award" for best magazine reporting from abroad (with James Pringle, Arnaud de Borchgrave, and Kim Willenson), but it would also prove the highpoint of her career. Riding in Somalia in a Land Rover with a poor suspension, Peer broke her coccyx, an injury which left her in constant pain.

Peer returned to New York in 1978. She married John P. Jansson, an architect, whom she had first met in 1975. She continued writing for Newsweek, serving as a senior writer and general editor, but constant pain from her injury (which was not fully diagnosed until 1981) interfered with her ability to work. She and her husband took a year off in 1980–1981 to sail around North America and the Caribbean. Peer chronicled the experience for MotorBoating & Sailing, including a thwarted hijacking by "dopers". In October 1981 Peer returned to her alma mater, which after becoming co-educational in 1969 was now simply Connecticut College, to accept the Connecticut College Medal, which is given to "alumna...of distinguished achievement."

== Death ==
The physical and psychological pain resulting from her broken coccyx were such that Peer first contemplated suicide in the fall of 1981. She and Jansson separated the next year, though they remained close. Peer's relationship with her colleagues deteriorated, as did the quality of her work. New editor William Broyles, Jr. met with Peer on April 22, 1983, to inform her that Newsweek was firing her, effective July 31, 1984. For someone whose entire career had been at the same magazine and whose identity was bound up with that institution, it was a terrible shock. After her termination she would be on permanent disability, at considerably reduced pay. Elliott, her former editor who had taken a chance on her in the 1960s, recommended her for the curatorship of the Nieman Foundation for Journalism at Harvard University, but the job went to Howard Simons, latterly the managing editor of The Washington Post. Despondent, and in chronic pain, she committed suicide the night of May 26, 1984.

Peer's funeral was at St. Bartholomew's in Midtown Manhattan. Tex McCrary presided. Those delivering eulogies included Elliott, Jane Bryant Quinn, and Linda Bird Francke. The circumstances of Peer's death led to much soul-searching within Newsweek, which founded the "Elizabeth Peer Scholarship Fund" at the Columbia University Graduate School of Journalism. Peer's papers are at the American Heritage Center at the University of Wyoming.
