= Bet Mishpachah =

- בית משפחה
- Founded: 1975; 51 years ago
- Location(s): 1529 16th Street NW Washington, D.C. 20036 (Washington, D.C. JCC)
- Rabbi: Jake Singer Beilin
- Executive Director: Joshua Maxey
- Website: www.betmish.org
- Formerly called: Metropolitan Community Temple Mishpocheh

Bet Mishpachah
- Hebrew: בית משפחה
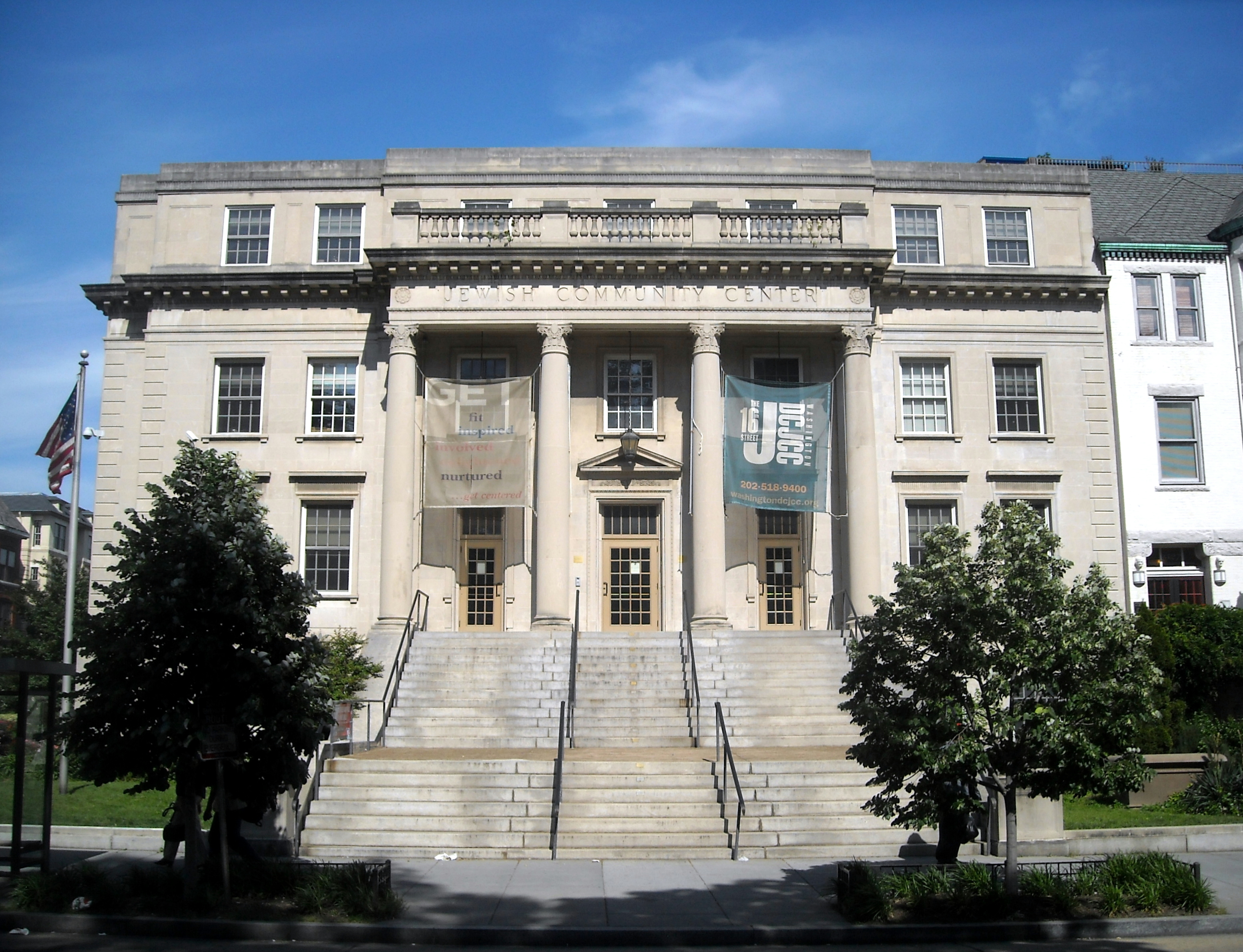

- Location in Washington, D.C.

Religion
- Affiliation: Judaism
- Rite: Non-denominational
- Ecclesiastical or organisational status: Community centre with a synagogue
- Leadership: Joshua Maxey, Executive Director Jake Singer-Beilin, Rabbi
- Status: Active

Location
- Location: 1529 16th Street NW, Dupont Circle, Washington, D.C. 20036
- Country: United States
- Coordinates: 38°54′39″N 77°02′10″W

Website
- www.betmish.org

Bet Mishpachah (Hebrew: בית משפחה, lit. 'House of Family') is a non-denominational Jewish egalitarian worshiping community and congregation that supports a synagogue. It is located in the Dupont Circle area of Washington, D.C., in the United States.

Bet Mishpachah is one of a number of national and international Jewish communities of LGBTQ+ affirming congregations that specifically welcome and embrace the LGBTQ+ community, along with all others who "wish to participate in an inclusive, egalitarian, and mutually supportive community".

Sabbath worship services and most religious and educational programs are held at the Edlavitch DC Jewish Community Center (EDCJCC) in Washington, DC.

== History ==
Bet Mishpachah was founded in 1975, as the Metropolitan Community Temple Mishpocheh. At first, its members were all men, and it later had woman as members too. In 1976, it hosted the First International Conference of Gay & Lesbian Jews, which was organized in response to the United Nations resolution equating Zionism with racism, in an effort to create a forum for communications and mutual support among gay and lesbian Jews. Bet Mishpachah was incorporated on July 26, 1977.

In 1978, the congregation elected members of its Board of Directors and began holding weekly worship services, using rented spaces in Washington, D.C. The following year, the congregation received a Torah scroll, rescued from The Holocaust, on permanent loan from the Westminster Synagogue in London. The scroll (a Sefer Torah, in Hebrew) once belonged to a small 500-year-old Jewish community in Dolní Kounice, a town destroyed in 1940, in the former Czechoslovakia.

In 1980, the congregation formally adopted its present name, Bet Mishpachah, "House of Family", and co-founded the World Congress of Gay & Lesbian Jews at the Third International Conference of Gay & Lesbian Jews, in San Francisco, California. At the time, Bet Mishpachah had 80 members. Its services, led by lay leadership, were held in the basement of a United Methodist church called Christ Church. In 1985, the congregation hosted the Ninth International Conference of the World Congress of Gay & Lesbian Jews.

In the 1980s and early 1990s, Bet Mishpachah lost several of its members to AIDS. The congregation decided it needed to hired its first rabbi, in part in order to help with the pastoral needs of members with partners who were terminal or had died. Rabbi Robert Saks was hired as their first rabbi, on a part-time basis, in 1991.

In 1991, Bet Mishpachah purchased its second Torah scroll. Like the first one, this was an historic scroll. It was written in 1917 in Czarist Russia, but never mounted on Etzei Chaim, the wooden poles to which the parchment is attached, and never used in synagogue services.

Also in 1991, the synagogue published its own siddur, prayerbook, for Sabbath/Shabbat and festivals. The siddur's text included mentioned both women and men, and it included a gender-neutral word for God. For example, in the siddur, the Amidah, an important prayer in every Jewish service, refers to avot v'Imahot (fathers and mothers) rather than only avot (fathers). Bet Mishpachah's 1991 prayerbook used the egalitarian, or fathers and mothers. In 1992, a second prayerbook, Ti'filot Nachumim (Prayers of Consolation), was created for use during shiva worship—special prayers during the first week following the death of a loved one, and memorial services.

In 1997, the congregation moved to the newly restored and reopened Washington, D.C. Jewish Community Center (closed since 1968). The following year, 1998, work was completed on a special five-volume High Holy Days machzor, prayerbook, "Chadeish Yameinu" ("Renew Our Days").

In 1998, the congregation hosted the Eighth Eastern Regional Conference of the World Congress of GLBT Jews. By 1999, Bet Mishpachah had over 300 members of the congregation. In 2000, it engaged its second rabbi, again on a part-time basis, Rabbi Leila Gal Berner. Rabbi Berner remained with the congregation through 2004.

In 2009, Rabbi Saks retired and became the rabbi emeritus of the congregation. That same year, Rabbi Toby Manewith began serving as rabbi. In 2013, Rabbi Laurie Green replaced Toby Manewith as rabbi. In 2019, Rabbi Laurie Green moved to Chicago, and Rabbi Jake Singer-Beilin replaced her as rabbi of Bet Mishapachah.

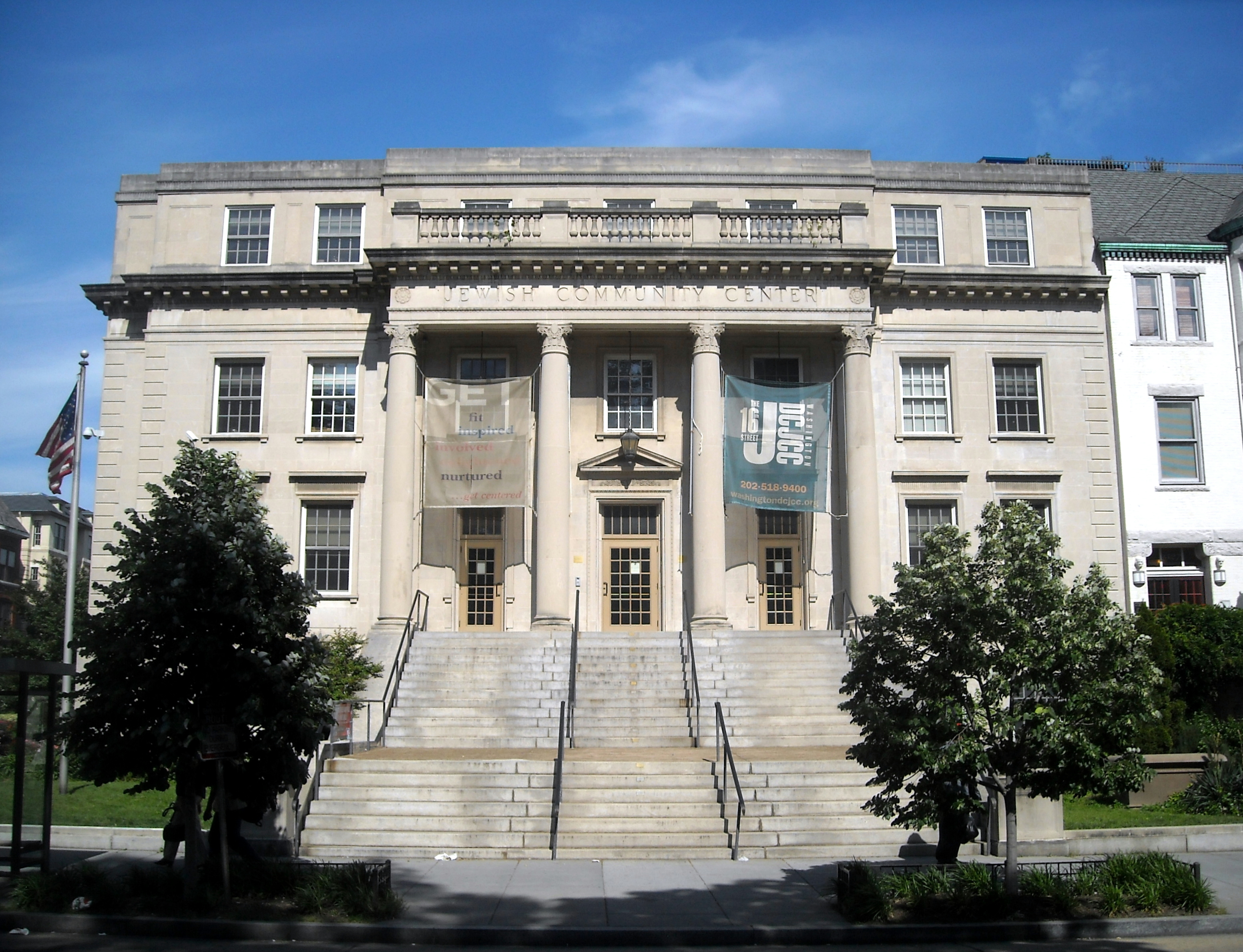
Washington, D.C. Jewish Community Center, Home of Bet Mishpachah

In 2015, the congregation revised its siddur, in order to be inclusive of all people including those who are non-binary. For example, in the revised siddur, the Amidah refers to a term without gender, dorot (generations), rather than avot v'Imahot (fathers and mothers). The new siddur also includes several readings with themes of inclusivity and a passage about World AIDS Day.

In March 2022, Joshua Maxey, a Jew of color, was hired as Bet Mishpachah's first Executive Director.

The congregation has also started a cemetery called Bet Mishpachah Cemetery, located in Congress Heights.

== Choir ==
Music is an integral element of Bet Mishpachah, and its choir, Tach'shitim (Jewels), originally formed as a trio in the 1980s, has added to worship services and special events for the congregation, and has also been featured in Jewish and interfaith services and concerts at other settings within the D.C. and Baltimore areas. Additionally, the choir released the recording, "Family and Friends," in 2000, and in 2004 it participated in the 7th International GALA Choruses Festival, in Montreal, Quebec, Canada. The choir was also featured in the 2006 documentary, Why We Sing.

== Community ==
Bet Mishpachah is a founding member of Keshet Ga’avah - the World Congress of GLBTQ Jews and a close partner with the Kurlander Program for GLBTQ Outreach and Engagement at the Edlavitch DCJCC. It is a participating member of the Network of Independent Jewish Communities and Havurot, administered by The Am Kolel Jewish Renewal Community of Greater Washington; the Jewish Funeral Practices Committee of Greater Washington; and the Jewish Community Relations Council (JCRC) of Greater Washington.

=== Center Faith ===
In addition to Bet Mishpachah's support to the larger LGBT Jewish community and to be part of LGBT interfaith efforts is support to Center Faith and participation in the Capital Pride Interfaith Service.

== Awards ==
In 2010, the congregation received the Mautner Project Healing Works Award.

== See also ==
- LGBT matters and religion
- LGBT rights in the United States
- LGBT-affirming religious groups
- Ordination of LGBT clergy in Judaism
- LGBT topics and Judaism
- Film, "Trembling Before G-d" (Documentary about LGBT Orthodox Jews.)
- Queer: reclaiming of a still sometimes controversial term
