= The Good Girls Revolt =

2012 book by Lynn Povich

The Good Girls Revolt: How the Women of Newsweek Sued their Bosses and Changed the Workplace
- First edition
- Author: Lynn Povich
- Published: September 10, 2012
- Publisher: PublicAffairs
- Pages: 304
- ISBN: 978-1610393263

The Good Girls Revolt: How the Women of Newsweek Sued their Bosses and Changed the Workplace is a book of nonfiction by Lynn Povich. The book, published in 2012, is based on the lawsuit female employees of Newsweek brought against their employer.

== Reception ==
The book received mostly positive reviews. The New York Times said, "If ever a book could remind women to keep their white gloves off and to keep fighting the good fight, this is the one." The Philadelphia Inquirer review said, "With vivid recollections of the author and major and minor participants, Povich, a party to the suit, succeeds in making recent history enraging, poignant, and even sexy."

== Television adaptation ==
The TV series based on the book was adapted by Amazon Video.
