= Shirley Povich =

American sportswriter and columnist (1905–1998)

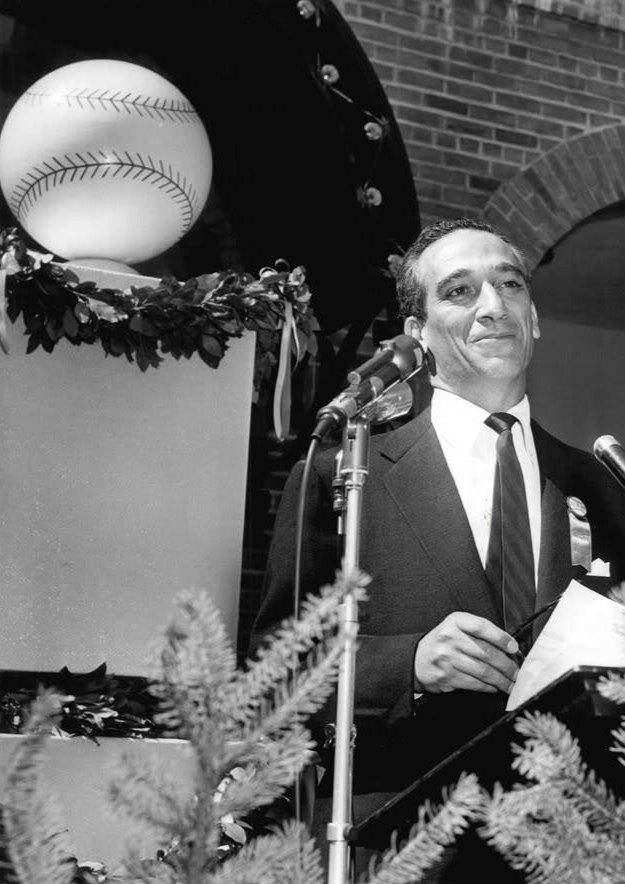
- Povich as master of ceremonies at Cooperstown, 1955
- Born: July 15, 1905; Eden, Maine, U.S.
- Died: June 4, 1998 (aged 92); Washington, D.C., U.S.
- Resting place: Elesavetgrad Cemetery
- Education: Georgetown University
- Occupations: Sportswriter; columnist; war correspondent
- Spouse: Ethyl Friedman (m. 1932)
- Children: 3, including Maury and Lynn

Shirley Lewis Povich (July 15, 1905 – June 4, 1998) was an American sportswriter and columnist who spent his entire 1923–1988 career with The Washington Post. Known for his sports coverage, Povich also served as a World War II war correspondent.

== Early life ==
Povich's parents were Jewish immigrants from Lithuania. Having grown up in coastal Bar Harbor, Maine (then known as Eden), far from a major league team, the first baseball game he ever saw was a game for which he wrote the game story.

== Journalism career ==
Povich joined the Post as a reporter in 1923 during his second year as a Georgetown University student, and in 1925 was named Editor of Sports. In 1933, he became a sports columnist, a responsibility that continued until his death, with only one interruption. In 1944, Povich took on the assignment of war correspondent for The Washington Post in the Pacific Theater. Following World War II, he returned to his sports desk. He was the sports editor for the Post for forty-one years. Then-Vice President Richard Nixon once told Post publisher Phil Graham: "Shirley Povich is the only reason I read your newspaper."

He celebrated his retirement in 1973, but continued to write more than 500 pieces and cover the World Series for the Post. He would write about both the modern game and memories of years past. At the time of his death, he was one of few working writers who had covered Babe Ruth. His final column was in the Post the day after his death at age 92.

Povich served as a contributor to the Ken Burns series Baseball that first appeared on PBS in 1994 by sharing memorable baseball events.

Povich is the author of The Washington Senators (G.P. Putnam Sons, 1954) and All These Mornings (Prentice-Hall, 1969). A collection of his columns, All Those Mornings...At the Post was published in April 2005 (PublicAffairs).

== Honors ==
Among his prestigious honors: the National Headliners 1964 Grantland Rice Award for sports writing, the Red Smith Award in 1983, and election to the National Sportswriters Hall of Fame in 1984. In 1975, he was a recipient of the J. G. Taylor Spink Award from the Baseball Writers' Association of America (BBWAA). He was president of the BBWAA in 1955.

Povich's first name accounted for his listing in Who's Who of American Women in 1958. He recalled in his autobiography that "Shirley" was a common name for boys where he came from, but many who read his column thought Povich was a woman; in jest, Walter Cronkite even proposed marriage to "her."

Shirley Povich Field, located in Bethesda, Maryland, is the home of the Bethesda Big Train (a team in the Cal Ripken Summer Collegiate Baseball league) and of the Georgetown University baseball team. A bronze statue of Povich with baseball pitcher Walter Johnson was unveiled at Povich Field in 2021.

The Philip Merrill College of Journalism at the University of Maryland on November 2, 2011, announced the creation of the Shirley Povich Center for Sports Journalism, to expand its highly popular sports news program into a national leader in sports journalism education. "Most important, the center will serve as a launching pad for students to learn, actively participate in and develop the journalistic skills they need to meet the challenges facing them as the next generation of sports journalists", said George Solomon, the former Washington Post Assistant Managing Editor for Sports who would become the center's director. The center was made possible by a $1 million challenge gift from Povich's children.

The University of Maryland maintains the collections of Povich, including memorabilia, the documentary "Mornings with Shirley Povich", personal papers and work from his career at The Washington Post.

The press box at Washington, D.C.'s Nationals Park is named in honor of Povich, cited as a longtime friend of former Washington Nationals Principal Owner Theodore N. Lerner by the team.

== Personal life ==
He was the father of attorney David Povich, American television personality Maury Povich, and editor Lynn Povich. He was fond of giving Louisville Slugger baseball bats as birthday presents to his friends' children.

Povich died of a heart attack on June 4, 1998, at age 92. A column he had already written appeared in The Washington Post the next day. His wife, Ethyl Friedman, died in April 2004.

He is buried in Elesavetgrad Cemetery in Washington, D.C.
