= Olivet University =

Private Christian institution of biblical higher education in Anza, California, U.S.

- Type: Private university
- Established: 2000; 26 years ago
- Founder: David Jang
- Religious affiliation: World Olivet Assembly
- Endowment: $58.2 million (2024)
- President: Jonathan Park
- Vice-president: Walker Tzeng
- Location: Anza, California, United States
- Colors: Burgundy, gold
- Website: www.olivetuniversity.edu

Olivet University is a private Christian university in Anza, California, United States. It was founded by David Jang in 2000 and is accredited by the Association for Biblical Higher Education to award certificates, bachelor's, master's, D. Min., and Ph.D. degrees. Olivet has an additional campus in California and formerly also operated in several other states. Its New York State operations were not renewed after the permission to operate expired. In December 2024, the state of California withdrew its license to operate effective January 10, 2025 but Olivet continues to operate under religious exemption while appealing the California BPPE decision.

== History ==
Olivet Theological College and Seminary was founded by evangelical pastor David J. Jang in 2000, in Seoul, South Korea, where it was co-located with the Southern Cross College Korea Campus, and in Los Angeles. Jang was a member of the faculty of Southern Cross College and the first director of its Korea campus. The college was intended to train ministers for Jang's denomination, but eventually functioned more as a "seedbed" for mission, offering multiple study fields and distance learning to ministry-bound students.

By 2004, the seminary expanded and incorporated into a university comprising five programs: Olivet Theological College & Seminary, Jubilee College of Music, Olivet College of Art & Design, Olivet College of Journalism, and Olivet Institute of Technology, and relocated to San Francisco. Ralph D. Winter advised Jang on the relocation and expansion plan, and later served as the honorary chairman of Olivet University. The university moved into the former University of California, Berkeley Downtown Extension Campus, near the Moscone Center, in 2005. They also founded Olivet Business School, which offers MBA programs and opened extension sites in Nashville, Tennessee, San Francisco, and Washington, D.C. Olivet School of Art & Design, Olivet School of Language Education, Olivet School of Media and Communication, and Olivet School of Language Education were later added to accommodate different degree programs.

By the late 2010s, in addition to California, Olivet University had operations in the District of Columbia; Florida (Sanford, near Orlando); Georgia (Atlanta); Illinois (Chicago); Missouri (St. Louis); New York (Dover and Manhattan; and Tennessee (Nashville). In California, in addition to its main campus in Anza it had a campus in Mill Valley, formerly the site of Golden Gate Baptist Theological Seminary.

On November 26, 2018, the Manhattan District Attorney indicted the university and three of its officials with money laundering, fraud, and conspiracy in connection with the investigation into IBT Media. The indictment alleged that the university and its officials overstated the university's financial health to lenders and created a fictional auditor to approve its financial statements, then used funds for operational purposes rather than purchasing equipment. The logic of the indictment, however, was questioned as no one involved enriched themselves and no lender lost money. On February 20, 2020, Olivet University pleaded guilty to one count of conspiracy and falsifying business records and paid $1.25 million in forfeiture.

In 2022, the Department of Homeland Security brought new charges of money laundering and also of human and labor trafficking and visa fraud. Olivet University did not plea guilty to money laundering charge. In June 2022, the New York State Education Department did not renew Olivet University's temporary permission to operate in New York, and withdrew the university's license to offer courses or programs for academic credit in the state, citing "a pattern of mismanagement" and ties to "criminal activity". The university and its president criticized the unfair nature of NYSED's decision that were influenced by Newsweek and ignored Olivet's report.

In 2022, the California Bureau for Private Postsecondary Education began an investigation into the university's operations in the state, shortly after Olivet University was recovering from the 2022 Fairview Fire and the evacuation order. On December 10, 2024, a judge with the state Office of Administrative Hearings revoked the university's license to operate in California and ordered it to cease operations in the state effective January 10, 2025, based on deficiencies in faculty qualifications, student record-keeping, and educational standards. Olivet announced its intention to appeal the decision and continue operations under a claim of religious exemption. In August 2025, Cornerstone Payment Systems, whose owner is a close friend of Newsweek's CEO Dev Pragad, filed a California racketeering suit seeking at least $8.6 million, naming Olivet University and other David Jang–linked entities and alleging diversion of factored funds via wire fraud and money laundering. The attorneys for Cornerstone Payment System withdrew from the case and the case has been dismissed. Olivet University's zoning change application received unanimous approval in the Riverside County Board of Supervisors.

== Academics ==
Olivet University is divided into eight colleges: Jubilee College of Music, Olivet Business School, Olivet Institute of Technology, Olivet School of Art & Design, Olivet School of Language Education, Olivet School of Media & Communication, Olivet Theological College & Seminary, and Zinzendorf School of Doctoral Studies. The university has religious exemption verification by the BPPE (Bureau for Private Postsecondary Education) to grant bachelors, master's, and doctoral degrees, and certificates. The Ralph D. Winter Library, named in July 2007 for missiologist and Olivet University Honorary Chairman Ralph D. Winter, currently features 150,000 physical and electronic items for Biblical higher education and research, which are distributed throughout the university's main library, the William L. Wagner Mission Library, the Asian library, and seven specialized libraries.

== Partnership with IBT Media ==
IBT Media says it has an ongoing "working relationship" with Olivet University which includes the school's providing design assistance and computer resources, and IBT Media's providing internships for students. IBT characterizes this relationship as similar to those Silicon Valley companies have with local universities. However, publication Christianity Today alleges that IBT Media has a close relationship both with Olivet and with its founder, controversial evangelical pastor David J. Jang. It claims that Jang is an investor in and has exercised control over IBT Media. Executives characterize the relationship as being between the institutions and not the founders, and that it is purely operational. Additionally, students of Olivet worked for IBT Media in the early days of the International Business Times.
