= Richard Mills Smith =

American editor and journalist (born 1946)

Richard Mills Smith (born 1946) is an American editor and journalist who has served as Editor-in-Chief, CEO and Chairman of the Newsweek magazine. He was Newsweek chair from 2007 to 2011.

== Education ==
Smith graduated Phi Beta Kappa from Albion College in 1968, attended Columbia University's School of International and Public Affairs and received an M.S. from Columbia University Graduate School of Journalism in 1970.

== Career ==
=== Newsweek ===
Smith joined Newsweek in 1970, soon rising to Asian editor and Hong Kong bureau chief. He became editor of all international editions in 1978 and editor-in-chief in 1984. He was promoted to president in 1984 and CEO in 1991. Smith became president in May 1991 and retained his role as editor in chief. He stepped down as editor in chief and chief executive of Newsweek in 2007. From 1998 to 2011, he was chairman of Newsweek. He had spent 23 years as the magazine's editor-in-chief, and 16 years as chairman and CEO.

=== Other positions ===
Smith served as chairman of the Magazine Publishers of America and as a board member for the American Society of Magazine Editors.

He joined the board in 1995, and then in 2010, Smith became president of The Pinkerton Foundation, a nonprofit organization supporting programs for disadvantaged and at-risk young people in New York City. Building on this mandate, the foundation currently carries out its mission mainly through its support of endeavors that strengthen youth programming in poor communities. In 2024, the foundation made grants to 325 organizations totaling $37 million.

Smith has also served as a board member of Temple-Inland Co. the Forestar Group, and tech startup Videolicious.com. He is a former board member of the Smithsonian's Cooper-Hewitt National Design Museum and Albion College.

He is on the boards of the Columbia Graduate School of Journalism, the Harvard AIDS Initiative and the Stanford Center on Longevity.

He joined the Seoul International Business Advisory Council in 2006, serving as vice chairman from 2015 to 2019.

He is on the board and has been chairman of the ExCo Leadership Group (formerly Merryck & Co. Americas), a CEO mentoring firm.

== Recognition ==
Smith has received honorary degrees from Albion College, Eastern Michigan University. He has also received the Distinguished Alumni and Founder's awards from the Columbia University Graduate School of Journalism and the Columbia University Alumni Medal.

In 2025, he was named honorary doctor of humane letters at the Gilder Graduate School at the American Museum of Natural History.

In 2002, he received the Henry Johnson Fisher Award for Lifetime Achievement. In 2016, he was named an Honorary Citizen of Seoul for his contributions to the Korean capital.

== Personal life ==
Smith's wife is medical anthropologist Dr. Soon-Young Yoon.
