= Samuel T. Williamson =

American journalist, biographer, and book reviewer (1891-1962)

Samuel Thurston Williamson (1891–1962) was an American journalist, biographer, and book reviewer. Williamson co-founded Newsweek magazine in 1933 and then served as its first editor-in-chief (1933–1938).

== Early life and education ==
Williamson was born in a coastal area of Maine in 1891. After graduating from Haverhill High School in Haverhill, Massachusetts, Williamson completed a post-graduate year at Morristown School (now Morristown-Beard School) in Morristown, New Jersey in 1912. He then received his bachelor's degree from Harvard University in 1916. In 1920, Williamson served on the executive committee of a $500,000 fundraising campaign to establish an endowment at Morristown School.

== Journalism career ==
Williamson began his journalism career as a reporter at The New York Times in 1916. He left soon after starting this job to serve in World War I. After returning to America, Williamson rejoined the Times and began working as a reporter in their Washington, D.C. Bureau. He covered the 1920 Republican National Convention that nominated Warren G. Harding and Harding's campaign; Williamson later covered Harding's presidential administration for the newspaper. During the fall of 1922, Williamson sailed with a U.S. destroyer squadron during its trip to Constantinople (now Istanbul, Turkey).

After traveling from Constantinople to Paris, Williamson returned to the U.S. with French statesman Georges Clemenceau, who served as Prime Minister of France between 1917 and 1920. Sailing forth on the Steamship Paris, they toured the U.S. together during Clemenceau's lecture circuit. Clemenceau lectured about France's position in the postwar adjustment of Europe.

Williamson later served as a member of the editorial staff of the Sunday Times, and he penned the "Headline Footnotes" column. Williamson served as Assistant Sunday Editor of The Times until leaving for his job at Newsweek in 1933. Returning to The Times in 1938, Williamson wrote feature articles for The Sunday Times that discussed Franklin D. Roosevelt's speeches, the Brookings Institution, and other subjects. He also wrote numerous book reviews for The Times and penned Imprint of a Publisher: The Story of Frank Gannett and His Independent Newspapers, which Robert M. McBride published in 1948. Media businessman Frank Gannett founded Gannett Company, Inc., which later became the largest U.S. publisher of newspapers.

== Military service during World War I ==
After receiving training at the Officers' Training School in Camp Upton, New York, Williamson received assignment to Company M with the 308th Infantry of the 77th Division. Upon earning a promotion to lieutenant, he transferred to Company K with the 9th Infantry Regiment's Second Division. Williamson then worked as an instructor at the Infantry Officers Training School in Valbonne. He later transferred to Company M with the 9th Infantry and received a detail to the General Headquarters of the American Expeditionary Forces in Paris, France. During his service in World War I, Williamson participated in the Aisne Defensive, the Battle of Saint-Mihiel, and the Meuse-Argonne Offensive.

== Family life ==
Williamson married Cora Mancia Chase, a soprano in the Metropolitan Opera in New York City, on May 5, 1923. Guests attending the wedding ceremony in Haverhill, Massachusetts included President Harding and First Lady Florence Hardy, Attorney General Harry M. Daugherty, and Postmaster General Harry S. New. President Harding sent Chase a bouquet of flowers from the White House conservatories, and he mailed the couple a telegram: "Mrs. Harding joins in most hardy congratulations and most cordial wishes to yourself and bride. We shall be glad to have you share with Mrs. Williamson the high regard we hold for you."

== Works ==
- Frank Gannett: A Biography (1940)
- How to Write Like a Social Scientist (1947)
- Imprint of a Publisher, the story of Frank Gannett and his independent newspapers (1948)
- The Road Is Yours; The Story of the Automobile and the Men Behind It (with Reginald M. Cleveland) (1951)
