= Bet Mishpachah Cemetery =

Jewish cemetery in Washington, DC

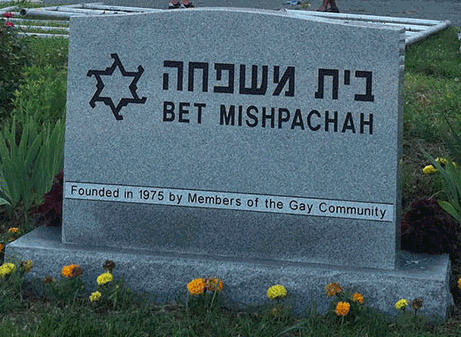
- Interactive map of Bet Mishpachah Cemetery

Details
- Location: 3233 15th Place SE, Washington, D.C.
- Country: U.S.
- Coordinates: 38°50′54″N 76°59′03″W
- Type: Jewish
- Owned by: Bet Mishpachah
- Find a Grave: Bet Mishpachah Cemetery

The Bet Mishpachah Cemetery is a recently established Jewish cemetery located in the Congress Heights neighborhood of Washington, D.C. The cemetery is for the Bet Mishpachah community (Hebrew: בית משפחה) located in the Dupont Circle neighborhood.

This cemetery is located on land purchased from Elesavetgrad Cemetery and is adjacent to the Ohev Shalom, Adas Israel, and Washington Hebrew cemeteries. The address is 3233 15th Place SE, Washington, D.C.

The cemetery marker stated it was founded in 1973, however, that refers to the founding of the organization. The first plots to be used to inter members were obtained in March 2012. As of May 2013, no one has been interred in these plots.
