= Elesavetgrad Cemetery =

Jewish cemetery in Anacosta, Washington, D.C.

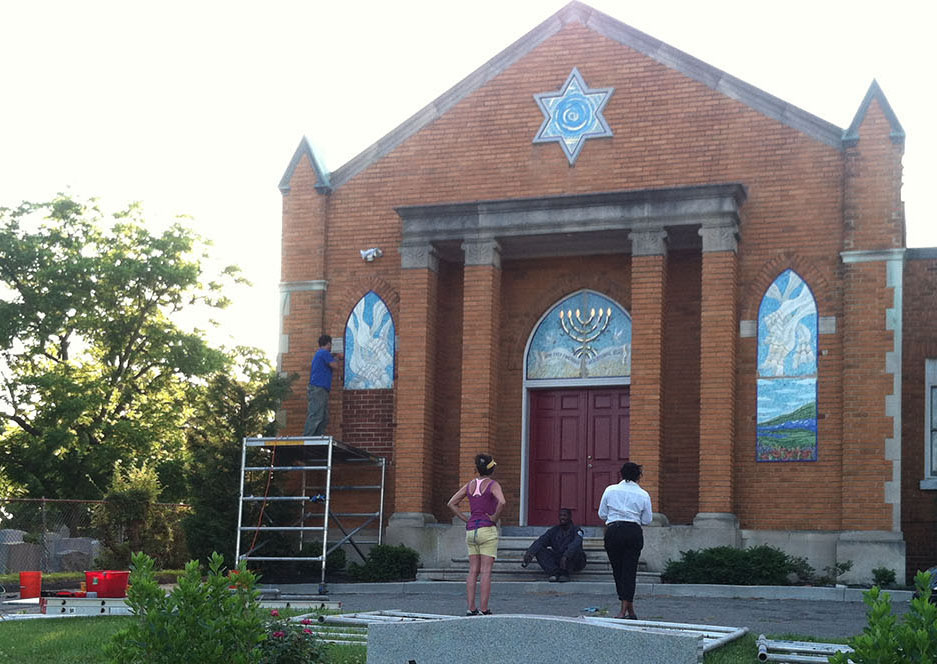
- Mosaics being installed on the Elesavetgrad chapel
- Interactive map of Elesavetgrad Cemetery

Details
- Established: December 1911
- Location: Washington, D.C.
- Country: United States
- Coordinates: 38°50′54″N 76°59′07″W
- Type: Jewish
- Size: 2.6 acres (1.1 ha)
- Website: Elesavetgrad-Cemetery Association & DC Hebrew Beneficial Assoc.
- Find a Grave: Elesavetgrad Cemetery

The Elesavetgrad Cemetery DCHBA is a 2.6 acre Jewish cemetery located in Southeast Washington, D.C. The cemetery was established in December 1911. This cemetery is adjacent to the Ohev Sholom, Adas Israel, Bet Mishpachah and Washington Hebrew cemeteries.

== History ==
The cemetery was founded in 1911. The name is derived from the English equivalent of Elesavetgrad, Ukraine, the ancestral home to many of the founding members.

== Notable burials ==
- Shirley Lewis Povich (1905–1998), Sportswriter

== See also ==
- Bet Mishpachah Cemetery
