= Dev Pragad =

President and CEO of Newsweek (born 1984)

- Born: 1984 or 1985 (age 41–42); India
- Citizenship: British; American
- Education: King's College London; Harvard Business School
- Occupation: Businessman
- Known for: CEO and co-owner of Newsweek
- Title: President and CEO of Newsweek
- Board member of: Harvard Business Publishing Shorenstein Center Advisory Board
- Website: devpragad.com

Dev Pragad (born 1984) is the British-American president and CEO of Newsweek. He is also co-owner of Newsweek, acquiring a half-interest in 2018.

== Early life and education ==
Pragad was born in India, grew up in the United Kingdom, and graduated from King's College London with a Bachelor of Engineering in computer science/electronics and a Ph.D in Electrical Engineering. He relocated to New York and became an American citizen, with dual citizenship in the UK. He also completed the Owner/President Management program, an Alumni granting 2 year executive education program of Harvard Business School.

== Career ==
Prior to becoming CEO of Newsweek, Pragad managed its international edition from London in 2014. In 2018, Newsweek was spun off as a standalone company, Newsweek Publishing LLC, from IBT Media with Pragad and Johnathan Davis each owning 50% of that company.

Pragad was the subject of a Harvard Business School case study published in 2021. The case study focused on Newsweek's use of data collection and performance measurements to grow the publication's readers and revenue.

Pragad launched Newsweek Rankings, which has become the fastest-growing part of the business. Rankings include the World's Best Hospitals, Auto Disruptor Awards, and other corporate and employer rankings.

In November 2024 Pragad interviewed South Korean President Yoon Suk Yeol for Newsweek.

In January 2025, Pragad was the Guest of Honour at the 18th Pravasi Bharatiya Divas (PBD) Convention in Bhubaneswar. The event focused on the Indian diaspora's contributions to India's development.

In June 2025, Newsweek, under Pragad's direction, acquired Adprime, a healthcare-focused advertising technology firm.

== Other roles and honors ==
Pragad is a member of the advisory board of the King's Trust USA. He is an honorary fellow of King's College London and a member of the King's College London Impact Leaders Board. In January 2026, Pragad was appointed to the Board of Directors of Harvard Business Publishing (HBP), the publishing and learning arm affiliated with Harvard Business School. Pragad is also a member of advisory board of the Shorenstein Center on Media, Politics and Public Policy at Harvard Kennedy School.
