= Lynn Povich =

American journalist

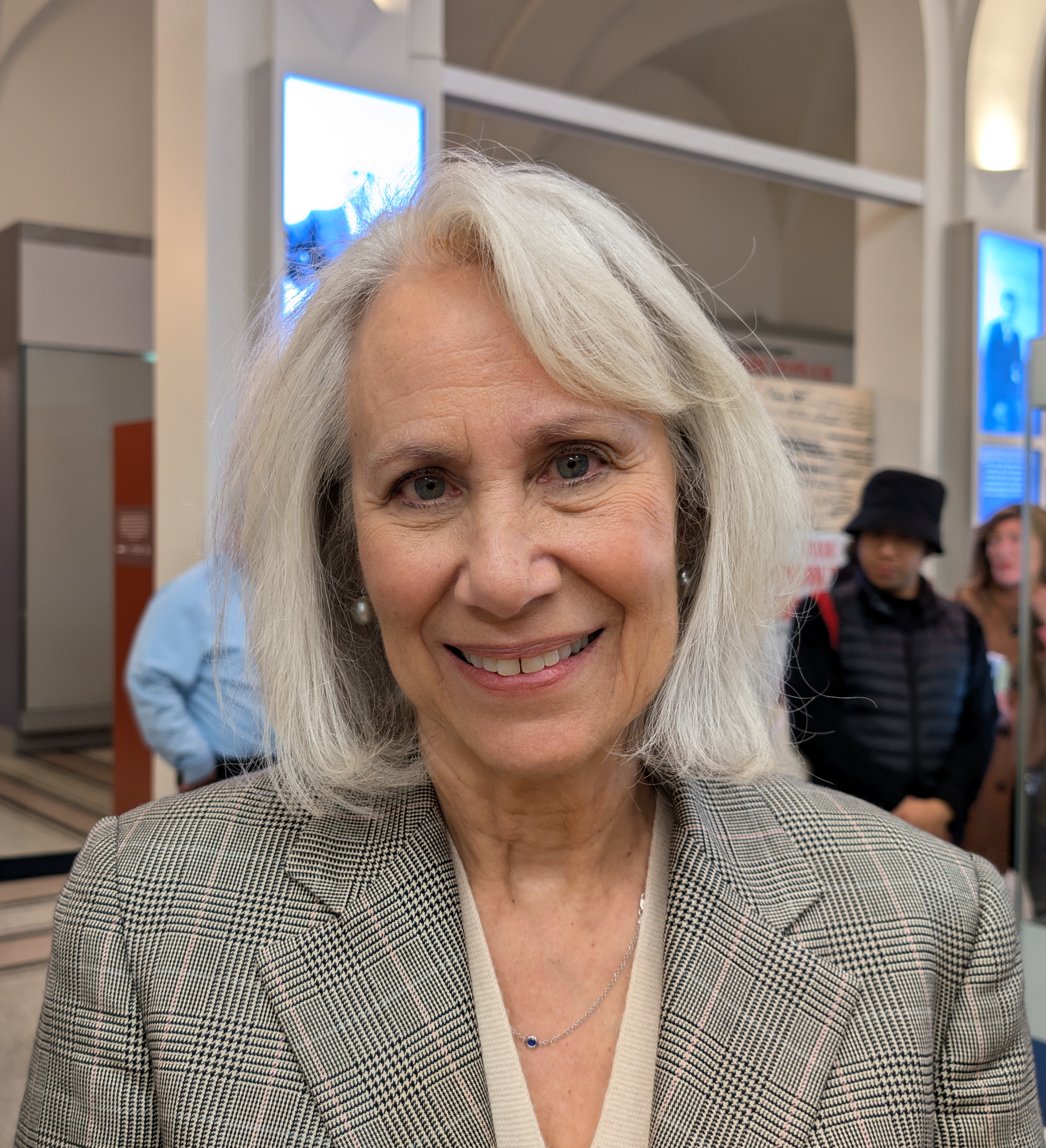
- Povich at the New York Historical Society, 2024
- Born: 1943 (age 82–83); Washington D.C., United States
- Occupations: Journalist, editor, author
- Spouses: Jeffrey Young (m. 1967; div. 1976) Stephen B. Shepard (m. 1979)
- Father: Shirley Povich
- Relatives: Maury Povich (brother)
- Website: lynnpovich.com

Lynn Povich (born 1943) is an American journalist. She began her career as a secretary in the Paris Bureau of Newsweek magazine, rising to become a reporter and writer in New York in the late 1960s. In 1970, she was one of a group of women who sued the magazine for sex discrimination. Five years later, she was appointed the first woman senior editor in Newsweek's history. Povich is the daughter of journalist Shirley Povich and the sister of Maury Povich.

== Personal life ==
Lynn Povich is the daughter of Ethyl and The Washington Post sports journalist Shirley Povich. She is of Jewish descent. She majored in modern European history at Vassar College, and upon graduating in June 1965, left to work as a secretary in the Newsweek's Paris bureau. There she worked with Elizabeth Peer, Newsweek's first female foreign correspondent, who Povich would later consider "[o]ne of the great influences of my life." After a year and a half abroad, she returned to New York in November 1966 as a researcher for Newsweek and married Jeffery Young in June of next year. In March 1969, she became a junior writer.

== Lawsuit ==
In 1970, Eleanor Holmes Norton represented 60 female employees of Newsweek (including Povich) who had filed a claim with the Equal Employment Opportunity Commission that Newsweek had a policy of only allowing men to be reporters. The women won, and Newsweek agreed to allow women to be reporters. The day the claim was filed, Newsweek's cover article was "Women in Revolt", covering the feminist movement; the article was written by a woman who had been hired on a freelance basis since there were no female reporters at the magazine.

== Publications ==
In 2005, for the 100th anniversary of the Washington Post, she published a collection of Shirley Povich's sports journalism, All those mornings-- at the Post : the twentieth century in sports from famed Washington post writer Shirley Povich. According to WorldCat, the book is held in 243 libraries.

She also published in 2012 a book called The Good Girls Revolt: How the Women of Newsweek Sued their Bosses and Changed the Workplace detailing the lawsuits. According to WorldCat, the book is held in 756 libraries.

A series of interviews with her was published by the Washington Press Club Foundation in its oral history project, "Women in journalism".

== Awards ==
- Foremother award from The National Center for Health Research, 2018
- The Good Girls Revolt: How the Women of Newsweek Sued their Bosses and Changed the Workplace was named a top ten book on the Amelia Bloomer Book List in 2014
