= Newsweek =

Weekly news magazine, based in New York City

- Cover of the issue from June 12, 2020
- Editor-in-chief: Jennifer Cunningham
- Former editors: Malcolm Muir (1937–1959); Osborn Elliott (1961–1976); Jon Meacham (2006–2010)
- Categories: Magazine, publisher
- Publisher: Dev Pragad, president and CEO
- Total circulation: 100,000 (2015)
- First issue: February 17, 1933; 93 years ago
- Company: NEWS-WEEK Inc. (1933–1937); Weekly Publications Inc. (1937–1961); The Washington Post Company (1961–2010); The Newsweek Daily Beast Company/IAC (2010–2013); IBT Media (2013–2018); Newsweek Publishing LLC (2018–present)
- Country: United States
- Based in: New York City
- Language: English, Japanese, Korean, Polish, Romanian, Spanish, Rioplatense Spanish, Arabic, Serbian
- Website: newsweek.com
- ISSN: 0028-9604
- OCLC: 818916146

Newsweek is an American weekly news magazine based in New York City. Founded as a weekly print magazine in 1933, it was widely distributed during the 20th century and has had many notable editors-in-chief. It is currently co-owned by Dev Pragad, the president and chief executive officer (CEO), and Johnathan Davis, who sits on the board; each owns 50% of the company.

In August 2010, revenue decline prompted the Washington Post Company to sell Newsweek to audio pioneer Sidney Harman for one US dollar and an assumption of the magazine's liabilities. Later that year, Newsweek merged with the news and opinion website The Daily Beast, forming the Newsweek Daily Beast Company, later called NewsBeast. Newsweek was jointly owned by the estate of Harman and the company IAC. Newsweek continued to experience financial difficulties, leading to the suspension of print publication at the end of 2012.

In 2013, IBT Media, the owner of the International Business Times, acquired Newsweek from IAC; the acquisition included the Newsweek brand and its online publication, but did not include The Daily Beast. IBT Media rebranded itself as Newsweek Media Group and in 2014 relaunched Newsweek in both print and digital form. In 2018, the company split into Newsweek Publishing and IBT Media. The split was accomplished one day before the Manhattan District Attorney indicted IBT Media co-owner Etienne Uzac on fraud charges.

== History ==
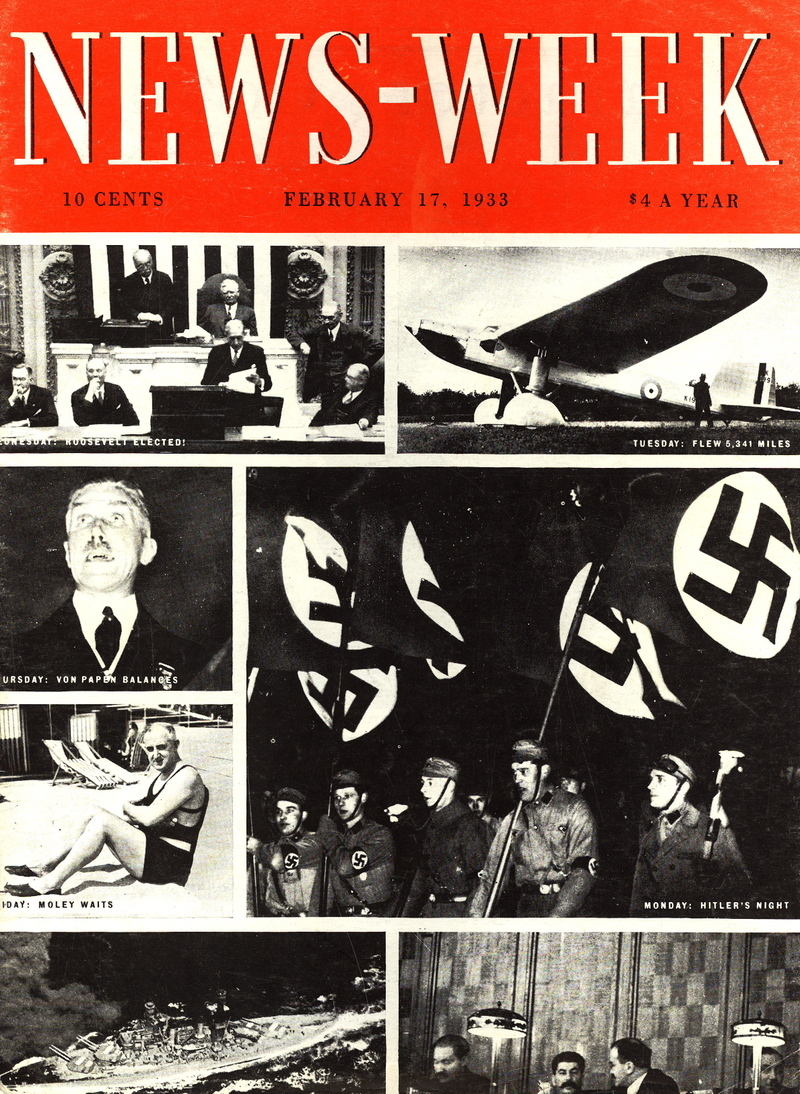
Cover of News-Week's first issue from February 17, 1933

=== Founding and early years (1933–1961) ===
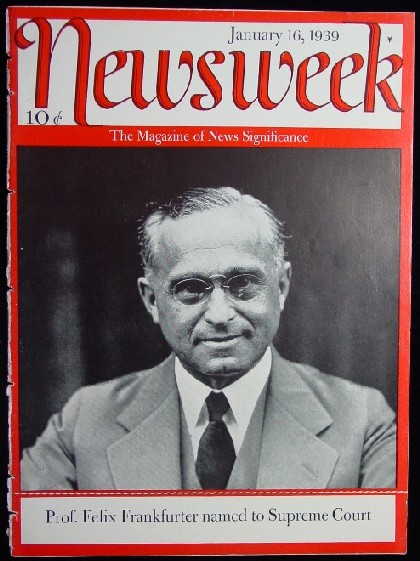
Cover of the issue from January 16, 1939, featuring Felix Frankfurter

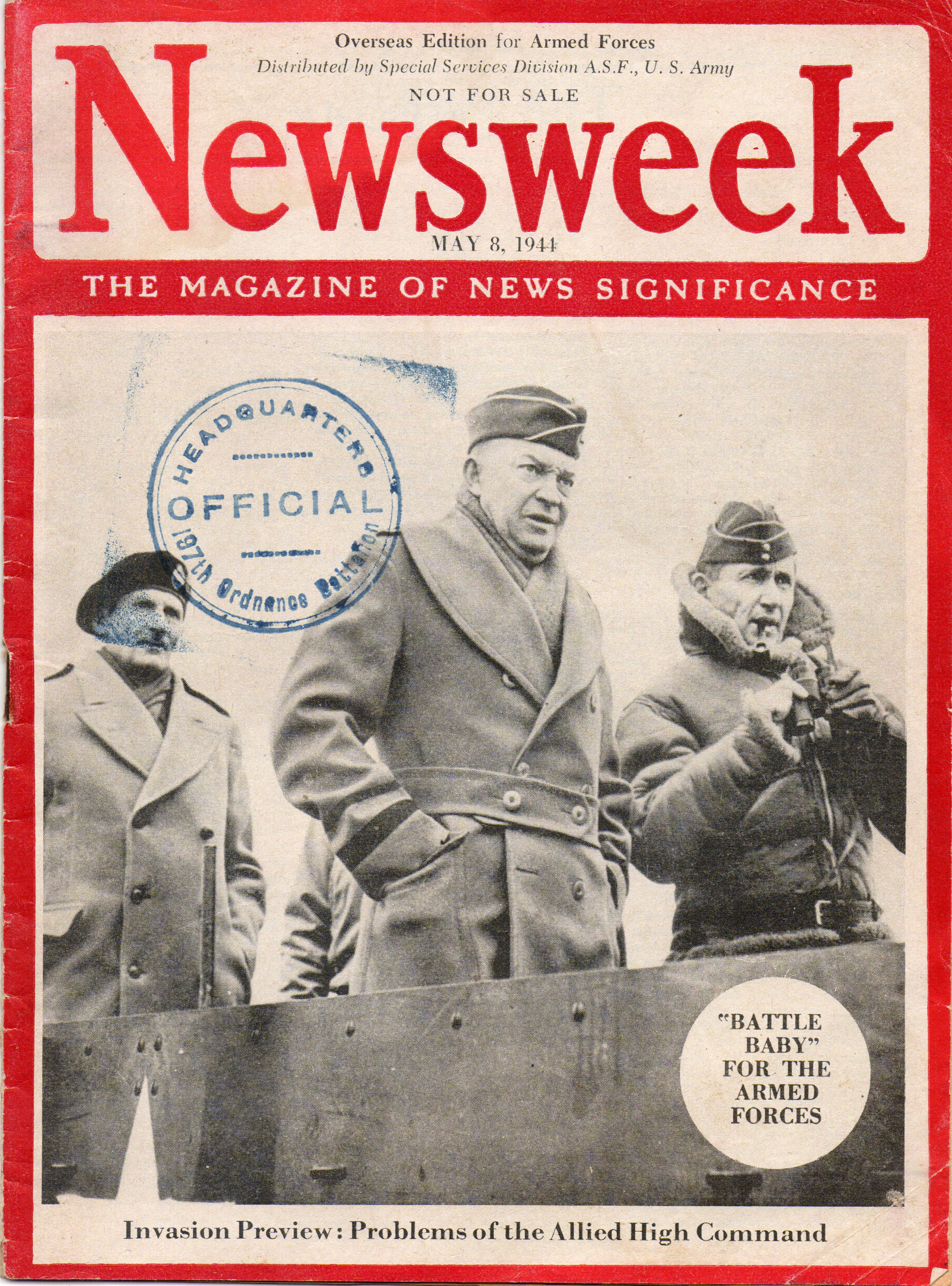
Cover of the "Armed Forces Overseas Edition" from May 8, 1944

News-Week was launched in 1933 by Thomas J. C. Martyn, a former foreign news editor for Time. He obtained financial backing from a group of U.S. stockholders "which included Ward Cheney, of the Cheney silk family, John Hay Whitney, and Paul Mellon, son of Andrew W. Mellon". Paul Mellon's ownership in News-Week marked "the first attempt of the Mellon family to function journalistically on a national scale". The group of original owners invested around US$2.5 million (equivalent to $62.18 million in 2025). Other large stockholders prior to 1946 were public utilities investment banker Stanley Childs and Wall Street corporate lawyer Wilton Lloyd-Smith.

Journalist Samuel T. Williamson was the first editor-in-chief of News-Week. The first issue of the magazine was dated February 17, 1933. Seven photographs from the week's news were printed on the first issue's cover. In 1937, News-Week merged with the weekly journal Today, which had been founded in 1932 by future New York Governor and diplomat W. Averell Harriman and Vincent Astor of the prominent Astor family. As a result of the deal, Harriman and Astor provided $600,000 (equivalent to $13,437,000 in 2025) in venture capital funds, and Vincent Astor became both the chairman of the board and its principal stockholder between 1937 and his death in 1959.

In 1937, Malcolm Muir took over as president and editor-in-chief. He changed the name of the magazine to Newsweek, emphasized interpretive stories, introduced signed columns, and launched international editions.

=== Under Post ownership (1961–2010) ===
The magazine was purchased by The Washington Post Company in 1961. Osborn Elliott was named editor of Newsweek in 1961 and became the editor-in-chief in 1969.

In 1970, Eleanor Holmes Norton represented sixty female employees of Newsweek who had filed a claim with the Equal Employment Opportunity Commission that Newsweek had a policy of allowing only men to be reporters. The women won the suit with the support of the American Civil Liberties Union (ACLU) and Newsweek agreed to allow women to be reporters. The day the claim was filed, Newsweek's cover article was "Women in Revolt", covering the feminist movement; the article was written by a woman who had been hired on a freelance basis since there were no female reporters at the magazine.

Edward Kosner became editor from 1975 to 1979 after directing the magazine's extensive coverage of the Watergate scandal that led to the resignation of President Richard Nixon in 1974. Richard M. Smith became chairman in 1998. Also in 1998, the magazine inaugurated its "Best High Schools in America" list, a ranking of public secondary schools based on the Challenge Index, which measures the ratio of Advanced Placement or International Baccalaureate exams taken by students to the number of graduating students that year, regardless of the scores earned by students or the difficulty in graduating. Schools with average SAT scores above 1300 or average ACT scores above 27 are excluded from the list; these are categorized instead as "Public Elite" high schools. In 2008, there were 17 Public Elites.

Smith resigned as board chairman in December 2007.

==== Restructuring and new owner (2008–2010) ====
Cover of the issue from May 24, 2009, the magazine's first after switching to an opinion and commentary format

During 2008–2009, Newsweek undertook a dramatic business restructuring. Citing difficulties in competing with online news sources to provide unique news in a weekly publication, the magazine refocused its content on opinion and commentary beginning with its issue from May 24, 2009. Its subscriber base shrank from 3.1 million to 2.6 million in early 2008, to 1.9 million in July 2009, and then to 1.5 million in January 2010—a decline of 50% in one year. Jon Meacham, editor-in-chief from 2006 to 2010, described his strategy as "counterintuitive" as it involved discouraging subscription renewals and nearly doubling subscription prices as it sought a more affluent subscriber base for its advertisers. During this period, the magazine also laid off staff. While advertising revenues were down almost 50% compared to the prior year, expenses were also diminished, whereby the publishers hoped Newsweek would return to profitability.

The financial results for 2009 as reported by The Washington Post Company showed that advertising revenue for Newsweek was down 37% in 2009 and the magazine division reported an operating loss for 2009 of US$29.3 million (equivalent to $43.97 million in 2025) compared to a loss of US$16 million in 2008 (equivalent to $23.93 million in 2025). During the first quarter of 2010, the magazine lost nearly US$11 million (equivalent to $16.24 million in 2025).

By May 2010, Newsweek had been losing money for the past two years and was put up for sale. The sale attracted international bidders. One bidder was Syrian entrepreneur Abdul Salam Haykal, CEO of Syrian publishing company Haykal Media, who brought together a coalition of Middle Eastern investors with his company. Haykal later claimed his bid was ignored by Newsweek's bankers, Allen & Co.

The magazine was sold to audio pioneer Sidney Harman on August 2, 2010, for US$1 in exchange for assuming the magazine's financial liabilities. Harman's bid was accepted over three competitors. Jon Meacham left the magazine upon completion of the sale. Sidney Harman was the husband of Jane Harman, at that time a member of Congress from California.

=== Merger with The Daily Beast (2010–2013) ===
At the end of 2010, Newsweek merged with the online publication The Daily Beast, following extensive negotiations between the respective proprietors. Tina Brown, The Daily Beast's editor-in-chief, became editor of both publications. The new entity, The Newsweek Daily Beast Company, was 50% owned by IAC/InterActiveCorp and 50% by Harman.

==== Redesign (2011) ====
Newsweek was redesigned in March 2011. The new Newsweek moved the "Perspectives" section to the front of the magazine, where it served as a summary of the past week's news reported on by The Daily Beast. More room was made available in the front of the magazine for columnists, editors, and special guests. A new "News Gallery" section featured two-page spreads of photographs from the week with a brief article accompanying each one. The "NewsBeast" section featured short articles, a brief interview with a newsmaker, and several graphs and charts for quick reading in the style of The Daily Beast. This is where the Newsweek staple "Conventional Wisdom" was located. Brown retained Newsweek's focus on in-depth, analytical features and original reporting on politics and world affairs, as well as a new focus on longer fashion and pop culture features. A larger culture section named "Omnivore" featured art, music, books, film, theater, food, travel, and television, including a weekly "Books" and "Want" section. The back page was reserved for a "My Favorite Mistake" column written by celebrity guest columnists about a mistake they made that helped shape who they are.

==== Cessation of print format (2012) ====
Newsweek's final print issue, released on December 31, 2012

On July 25, 2012, the company operating Newsweek indicated the publication was likely to go digital to cover its losses and could undergo other changes by the next year. Barry Diller, chairman of the conglomerate IAC/InterActiveCorp, said his firm was looking at options since its partner in the Newsweek/Daily Beast operation had pulled out.

At the end of 2012, the company discontinued the American print edition after 80 years of publication, citing the increasing difficulty of maintaining a paper weekly magazine in the face of declining advertising and subscription revenues and increasing costs for print production and distribution. The online edition was renamed Newsweek Global.

=== Spin-off to IBT Media, return to print (2013–2018) ===
In April 2013, IAC chairman and founder Barry Diller said at the Milken Global Conference that he "wished he hadn't bought" Newsweek because his company had lost money on the magazine and called the purchase a "mistake" and a "fool's errand".

On August 3, 2013, IBT Media acquired Newsweek from IAC on terms that were not disclosed; the acquisition included the Newsweek brand and its online publication but did not include The Daily Beast. On March 7, 2014, IBT Media relaunched a print edition of Newsweek with a cover story on the alleged creator of Bitcoin that was criticized for lacking substantive evidence. The magazine stood by its story.

IBT Media announced that the publication returned to profitability on October 8, 2014. In February 2017, IBT Media appointed Matt McAllester, then editor of Newsweek International, as global editor-in-chief of Newsweek.

In January 2018, Newsweek offices were raided by the Manhattan District Attorney's office as part of an investigation into co-owner Etienne Uzac. Columbia Journalism Review noted the probe "focused on loans the company took out to purchase the computer equipment", and several Newsweek reporters were fired after reporting on the issue. Uzac pleaded guilty to fraud and money laundering in 2020.

=== Newsweek Publishing LLC (2018–present) ===
In September 2018, after completing the strategic structural changes introduced in March of the same year, IBT Media spun off Newsweek into its own entity, Newsweek Publishing LLC, with co-ownership to Dev Pragad and Johnathan Davis of IBT Media.

In 2020, Newsweek's website hit 100 million unique monthly readers, up from seven million at the start of 2017. In 2021, traffic increased to 48 million monthly unique visitors in May 2022 from about 30 million in May 2019 according to Comscore. The "rebirth" of Newsweek was the subject of a study by Harvard Business School.

In September 2023, Newsweek announced it would be making use of generative AI in its operations. Its AI policy states that generative AI can be used in "writing, research, editing, and other core journalism functions" as long as journalists are involved throughout the process. In 2024, it rolled out an AI video production tool and started hiring an AI-focused breaking news team.

In 2024, Newsweek reported $90 million in revenue and a 20% profit margin, marking a significant commercial turnaround under CEO and co-owner Dev Pragad. Revenue more than quadrupled from $20 million that year, when the company operated at a 10% loss. Profitability has been consistent since 2019 on an EBITDA basis, with margins exceeding 20% since 2022. The company credits its success to a robust digital advertising business, which accounted for 63% of revenue in 2024 (80% of which came from programmatic channels and 20% from direct sales). Pragad attributes growth to a data-driven editorial strategy focused on what its readership were interested in, in contrast to declining readership trends across much of the news industry.

In 2025, Newsweek reported that, according to Comscore, its U.S. readership increased by 45 percent compared to the previous year. The publication was ranked No. 2 in overall growth in the U.S. by Similarweb's annual Digital 100 Report for 2024. To further diversify revenue, Newsweek has expanded into business-to-business advertising and launched an events division. Under CEO and owner, Dev Pragad, Newsweek also built and expanded its rankings division, its fastest-growing segment in the past two years, which is monetized through brand licensing and which contributed 13% of total revenue in 2024. Content syndication added another 16%.

In June 2025, Newsweek acquired Adprime, an adtech firm specializing in healthcare marketing as part of its expansion into the health sector. The acquisition included a demand-side platform and data services intended to support targeted advertising across Newsweek's healthcare content. The move contrasted with broader industry trends of divestment from adtech and aligned with Newsweek's strategy to increase business-to-business revenue through its health vertical.

In July 2026, a New York appellate court awarded Newsweek nearly $11 million in a dispute with former owner IBT Media, ruling that Newsweek had paid millions in payroll tax obligations on IBT Media’s behalf.

== Circulation and branches ==
In 2003, worldwide circulation was more than 4 million, including 2.7 million in the U.S; by 2010 it reduced to 1.5 million (with newsstand sales declining to just over 40,000 copies per week). Newsweek published editions in Japanese, Korean, Polish, Romanian, Spanish, Rioplatense Spanish, Arabic, Turkish, Serbian, as well as an English-language Newsweek International. Russian Newsweek, published since 2004, was closed in October 2010. The Bulletin (an Australian weekly until 2008) incorporated an international news section from Newsweek.

Based in New York City, the magazine claimed 22 bureaus in 2011: nine in the U.S.: New York City, Los Angeles, Chicago/Detroit, Dallas, Miami, Washington, D.C., Boston and San Francisco, and others overseas in London, Paris, Berlin, Moscow, Jerusalem, Baghdad, Tokyo, Hong Kong, Beijing, South Asia, Cape Town, Mexico City and Buenos Aires.

According to a 2015 column in the New York Post, after returning to print publication, Newsweek was selling c. 100,000 copies per month, with staff at that time numbering "about 60 editorial staffers", up from a low of "less than 30 editorial staffers" in 2013, but with plans then to grow the number to "close to 100 in the next year".

== Controversies ==
=== Allegations of sexism ===
In 1970, Eleanor Holmes Norton represented sixty female employees of Newsweek who had filed a claim with the Equal Employment Opportunity Commission that Newsweek had a policy of allowing only men to be reporters. The women won, and Newsweek agreed to allow women to be reporters. The day the claim was filed, Newsweek's cover article was "Women in Revolt", covering the feminist movement. The article was written by freelancer Helen Dudar in the belief that there were no female writers at the magazine capable of handling the assignment. Those passed over included Elizabeth Peer, who had spent five years in Paris as a foreign correspondent.

On June 2, 1986, Newsweek published a cover story titled "The Marriage Crunch", which claimed that "women who weren't married by 40 had a better chance of being killed by a terrorist than of finding a husband". Newsweek eventually apologized for the story and in 2010 launched a study that discovered two in three women who were 40 and single in 1986 had married since. The story caused a "wave of anxiety" and some "skepticism" amongst professional and highly educated women in the United States. The article was cited several times in the 1993 film Sleepless in Seattle, starring Tom Hanks and Meg Ryan. Comparisons have been made with this article and the current rising issues surrounding the social stigma of unwed women in Asia called sheng nu.

The controversial Newsweek cover from November 23, 2009, featuring Sarah Palin

On November 23, 2009, former Alaska governor and 2008 Republican vice presidential nominee Sarah Palin was featured on the cover of Newsweek, with the caption "How do you solve a problem Like Sarah?", and an image of Palin posing in athletic attire. Palin herself and other commentators accused Newsweek of sexism for their choice of cover for the issue, which discussed Palin's book, Going Rogue: An American Life. "It's sexist as hell," wrote Lisa Richardson for the Los Angeles Times. Taylor Marsh of The Huffington Post called it "the worst case of pictorial sexism aimed at political character assassination ever done by a traditional media outlet". David Brody of CBN News stated, "This cover should be insulting to women politicians." The cover includes a photo of Palin used in the August 2009 issue of Runner's World. The photographer may have breached his contract with Runner's World when he permitted its use in Newsweek, as Runner's World maintained certain rights to the photo until August 2010. It is uncertain, however, whether this particular use of the photo was prohibited.

In August 2011, Minnesota Republican Congresswoman and presidential candidate Michele Bachmann was featured on the cover of Newsweek, with the caption "the Queen of Rage". The photo of her was perceived as unflattering, as it portrayed her with a wide-eyed expression that some said made her look "crazy". Conservative commentator Michelle Malkin called the depiction "sexist", and Sarah Palin denounced the publication. Newsweek defended the cover's depiction of Bachmann, saying its other photos of her showed similar intensity.

The cover story from February 6, 2015, titled "What Silicon Valley Thinks of Women", caused controversy, due to both its illustration, described as "the cartoon of a faceless female in spiky red heels, having her dress lifted up by a cursor arrow," and its content, described as "a 5,000-word article on the creepy, sexist culture of the tech industry." Among those offended by the cover were Today co-host Tamron Hall, who commented, "I think it's obscene and just despicable, honestly." Newsweek editor-in-chief James Impoco explained, "We came up with an image that we felt represented what that story said about Silicon Valley ... If people get angry, they should be angry." The article's author, Nina Burleigh, asked, "Where were all these offended people when women like Heidi Roizen published accounts of having a venture capitalist stick her hand in his pants under a table while a deal was being discussed?"

In June 2024, Newsweek published an opinion piece with the title "Taylor Swift Is Not a Good Role Model", which claimed that American singer-songwriter Taylor Swift was a bad role model for young girls due to being unmarried, childless and having been in multiple relationships. The article was condemned as sexist, including by tennis player Martina Navratilova.

=== Factual errors ===
Unlike most large American magazines, Newsweek has not used fact-checkers since 1996.

In 1997, Newsweek was forced to recall several hundred thousand copies of a special issue called Your Child, which advised that infants as young as five months old could safely feed themselves zwieback toasts and chunks of raw carrot (to the contrary, both represent a choking hazard in children this young). The error was later attributed to a copy editor who was working on two stories at the same time.

In 2017, Newsweek published a story claiming that the First Lady of Poland refused to shake U.S. President Donald Trump's hand; fact-checking website Snopes described the assertion as "false". Newsweek corrected its story.

In 2018, Newsweek ran a story alleging that then-President Donald Trump had colored the American flag incorrectly while visiting a classroom; Snopes was unable to corroborate the photographic evidence.

In August 2018, Newsweek incorrectly reported that the Sweden Democrats, a far-right party, could win a majority in the 2018 Swedish parliamentary elections. Polls showed that the party was far away from winning a majority. By September 2018, Newsweek's article was still up.

In November 2022, during the Mahsa Amini protests in Iran, Newsweek incorrectly reported that Iran had ordered the execution of over 15,000 protesters. The claim was widely shared on social media, including by actresses Trudie Styler, Sophie Turner and Viola Davis, and Canadian prime minister Justin Trudeau. The number was actually derived from estimates from a United Nations human rights rapporteur and other human rights organizations of how many people were detained in Iran in connection with the protests, and Newsweek later retracted the underlying claim leading to the inference that the people faced a death sentence.

In October 2023, Newsweek incorrectly reported that a viral video of U.S. senator Tommy Tuberville falling down a flight of stairs while exiting an airplane had been recorded that month. The reporting by Newsweek drew comparisons to Tuberville's criticism of then-President Joe Biden similarly tripping on stairways. In reality, the video highlighted by Newsweek was filmed in 2014, nine years prior, before Tuberville's tenure as senator.

=== 2018 investigation and firings ===
On January 18, 2018, the Manhattan District Attorney's office raided Newsweek's headquarters in Lower Manhattan and seized 18 computer servers as part of an investigation related to the company's finances. IBT, then the owner of Newsweek, had been under scrutiny for its ties to David Jang, a South Korean pastor and the leader of a Christian sect called "the Community". In February 2018, several Newsweek staff were fired, and some resigned stating that management had tried to interfere in articles about the investigations.

=== Other ===
On November 29, 2001, Fareed Zakaria, a Newsweek columnist and editor of Newsweek International, attended a secret meeting with a dozen policy makers, Middle East experts and members of influential policy research organizations that produced a report for then-President George W. Bush and his cabinet outlining a strategy for dealing with Afghanistan and the Middle East in the aftermath of September 11, 2001. The meeting was held at the request of Paul D. Wolfowitz, then the Deputy Secretary of Defense. The unusual presence of journalists, who also included Robert D. Kaplan of The Atlantic Monthly, at such a strategy meeting was revealed in Bob Woodward's 2006 book State of Denial: Bush at War, Part III. Woodward reported in his book that, according to Kaplan, everyone at the meeting signed confidentiality agreements not to discuss what happened. Zakaria told The New York Times that he attended the meeting for several hours but did not recall being told that a report for the president would be produced. On October 21, 2006, after verification, the Times published a correction that stated:

An article in Business Day on October 9 about journalists who attended a secret meeting in November 2001 called by Paul D. Wolfowitz, then Deputy Secretary of Defense, incorrectly referenced Fareed Zakaria, editor of Newsweek International and a Newsweek columnist, regarding his participation. Mr. Zakaria was not told that the meeting would produce a report for the Bush administration, nor did his name appear on the report.

In January 1998, Newsweek reporter Michael Isikoff was the first reporter to investigate allegations of a sexual relationship between then-U.S. President Bill Clinton and Monica Lewinsky, but the editors spiked the story. The story soon surfaced online in the Drudge Report.

In the 2008 U.S. presidential election, the John McCain campaign wrote a lengthy letter to the editor criticizing a cover story in May 2008.

Newsweek journalists have expressed criticism of the editorial quality of its reporting since its change in ownership in 2013. In 2018, former Newsweek journalist Jonathan Alter wrote in The Atlantic that since being sold to the International Business Times in 2013 the magazine had "produced some strong journalism and plenty of clickbait before becoming a painful embarrassment to anyone who toiled there in its golden age". Former Newsweek writer Matthew Cooper criticized Newsweek for running multiple inaccurate stories in 2018.

In December 2019, journalist Tareq Haddad said he resigned from Newsweek when it refused to publish his story about documents published by WikiLeaks concerning the Organisation for the Prohibition of Chemical Weapons' report into the 2018 Douma chemical attack. Haddad said his information was inconvenient to the U.S. government which had retaliated after the chemical attack. A Newsweek spokesperson responded that Haddad "pitched a conspiracy theory rather than an idea for objective reporting. Newsweek editors rejected the pitch."

In August 2020, Chapman University professor John C. Eastman wrote a Newsweek op-ed asking if Kamala Harris's parents were U.S. citizens or lawful permanent residents at the time of her birth or if they were temporary visitors. He then stated that if they were temporary visitors, then "under the 14th Amendment as originally understood", she would not be considered a U.S. citizen and would not be eligible for her then-current position in the Senate. The op-ed resulted in the spread of 'birther-ism' conspiracy theories surrounding Kamala Harris. Newsweek later apologized for the op-ed, saying they had "entirely failed to anticipate the ways in which the essay would be interpreted, distorted and weaponized" and that their publication of it "was intended to explore a minority legal argument about the definition of who is a 'natural-born citizen' in the United States."

In December 2021, comedian Jon Stewart criticized Newsweek, declaring in a podcast titled "Clickbait is Arson," that its "business model is ... arson", after the magazine reported that he accused Harry Potter author J. K. Rowling of antisemitism.

In September 2022, Recorder published an investigation on press financing in Romania by the political parties in government. In the investigation, it accused Newsweek Romania of being paid €8,000 per month (€3,000 by Payment Services directive (PSD) and €5,000 by the National Liberal Party) to publish positive articles about the government. After the publication of the investigation, Newsweek Romania published an investigation about Recorder's owner who is the son of a former communist ambassador and also a nephew of a former KGB general. In response, Recorder's journalists accused Newsweek Romania of denigrating them.

In November 2022, the Southern Poverty Law Center reported that Newsweek had "taken a marked radical right turn by buoying extremists and promoting authoritarian leaders" since it hired conservative political activist Josh Hammer as editor-at-large. It noted the magazine's elevation of conspiracy theorists, publication of conspiracy theories about COVID-19, views such as support for a ban on all legal immigration to the United States and denying adults access to trans-affirming medical care, and failure to disclose potential conflicts of interest in the content published on Hammer's opinion section and podcast.

== Contributors and staff members ==
Notable contributors or employees have included:

- Shana Alexander
- Jonathan Alter
- David Ansen
- Monroe Anderson
- Pete Axthelm
- Maziar Bahari
- Paul Begala
- Arnold Beichman
- Peter Beinart
- Peter Benchley
- Lester Bernstein
- Ben Bradlee
- Dik Browne
- William Broyles Jr.
- Hal Bruno
- Arnaud de Borchgrave
- Eleanor Clift
- Nancy Cooper
- Kenneth G. Crawford
- Bill Downs
- Joshua DuBois
- Kurt Eichenwald
- Osborn Elliott
- Niall Ferguson
- Howard Fineman
- Nikki Finke
- Karl Fleming
- Lawrence Fried
- Milton Friedman
- David Frum
- Freeman Fulbright
- Robin Givhan
- Michelle Goldberg
- Meg Greenfield
- Josh Hammer
- Henry Hazlitt
- Wilder Hobson
- Robert Cunningham Humphreys
- Michael Isikoff
- Roger Kahn
- Jack Kroll
- Howard Kurtz
- Faisal Kutty
- Eli Lake
- John Lake
- Charles Lane
- John Lardner
- Robert K. Massie
- Jon Meacham
- Elizabeth Peer
- Jack Posobiec
- Lynn Povich
- Dev Pragad
- Anna Quindlen
- Karl Rove
- Paul Samuelson
- Dick Schaap
- Allan Sloan
- Andrew Sullivan
- Ralph de Toledano
- Michael Tomasky
- Peter Turnley
- Batya Ungar-Sargon
- Margaret Warner
- Mark Whitaker
- Arick Wierson
- George Will
- Elijah Wolfson
- Fareed Zakaria

Those who held the positions of president, chairman, or publisher under The Washington Post Company ownership include:

- Gibson McCabe
- Robert D. Campbell
- Peter A. Derow
- David Auchincloss
- Alan G. Spoon
- Richard Mills Smith

== Publications ==
Newsweek publishes World's Best Hospitals annually, a ranking of the best hospitals in 20 countries based on the opinions of medical professionals, patient survey results and key medical performance indicators. The countries monitored are the United States, Canada, Germany, France, United Kingdom, Italy, Spain, Switzerland, Netherlands, Sweden, Denmark, Norway, Finland, Israel, South Korea, Japan, Singapore, India, Thailand, Australia, Argentina, and Brazil.

== See also ==
- List of magazines by circulation
- Newsweek Argentina
- Newsweek Pakistan
- Newsweek gay actor controversy
- Russky Newsweek
