= IBT Media =

American media company

- Website type: Publication
- Owner: Etienne Uzac
- Website: corp.ibt.com
- Commercial: Yes
- Launched: 2006; 20 years ago (as IBT Media)
- Current status: Active

IBT Media is an American global digital news organization owned by supporters of religious leader David Jang. It publishes the International Business Times and Medical Daily, among others.

== History ==
IBT Media is a privately held company co-founded in 2006 by Etienne Uzac and Johnathan Davis. It is headquartered in New York City, in the Hanover Square neighborhood of Lower Manhattan.

The company achieved profitability by 2010, with much of its revenue coming from advertising. In 2011, the company relocated to Newsweek's former offices in Lower Manhattan. The following year, the International Business Times was reincorporated as IBT Media, becoming the parent company to IBTimes, and it also launched Bizu, a video web portal and platform.

In 2013, IBT Media broadened its portfolio with the launch of Medical Daily, HollywoodTake, and Latin Times. That same year, the company acquired Newsweek from IAC. In 2014, IBT Media reported revenue of about US$21 million and a profit of approximately US$500,000. Newsweek also returned to print in 2014 and soon after became profitable.

The company also undertook digital redesigns and optimization of both Newsweek and International Business Times websites in 2015, improving mobile responsiveness and user experience. In November 2016, IBT Media launched Newsweek International, consolidating its European and Asian editions under a unified brand based in London.

By 2017, the company had rebranded as Newsweek Media Group. In 2018, IBT Media spun off Newsweek into a separate company, making it a fully independent entity, while the remainder of the business continued as IBT Media.

== Platform ==
IBT Media had run on a proprietary content management system that it had built over several years. It currently runs on Drupal. The company started to tie in real-time analytics into the newsroom as early as 2010, and based on those results, optimize follow-up content, positioning, and editorial calendars to serve readers. Social feedback is also built into the newsroom.

The company has also created platforms for content. Bizu, a video platform for business professionals hosts content and also offers incremental revenue streams to content providers. The platform partners with IDG Communications and France 24 for content, and Digitas and PJA Advertising and others for monetization.

IBT Media is part of Economist's "Ideas Channel" ad-network which targets people in business and politics. The company's brands publish to a number of 3rd party platforms, including Flipboard, Zite.'s Social Reader.

== Assets ==
- International Business Times – global business and economic news, in seven languages across ten editions
- Medical Daily – medical news site
- Latin Times – Latin American-oriented news site
- iDigitalTimes (now Player One) – technology and digital media news site

== Chronology ==
- 2006 – International Business Times incorporates in New York.
- 2008–2010 – IBTimes launches specialty verticals: Jobs, Health, Real Estate, Education and Travel.
- 2011 – IBTimes moves into Newsweek's old offices.
- 2012 – International Business Times reincorporates as IBT Media, the new parent company to IBTimes, and launches Bizu, a video web portal and platform.
- 2013 – Medical Daily, HollywoodTake, and Latin Times are launched.
- 2013 – Newsweek is acquired.
- 2014 – Newsweek returns to print, and the Newsweek operations becomes profitable
- 2017 – Company rebrands as Newsweek Media Group.
- 2018 – Newsweek is spun off into a separate legal entity.
- 2018 – Company rebrands back to IBT Media after separating from Newsweek.
- 2020 – Former owner Etienne Uzac pleads guilty to money laundering and fraud.

== Controversies ==
=== Newsweek ===
In January 2018 Manhattan District Attorney staff raided the company's offices, taking away eighteen computer servers, in what Newsweek reported was part of an investigation into company finances. On February 1, 2018 co-owner and chairman Uzac, and his wife Marion Kim who acted as finance director, resigned.

On February 20, 2018, Newsweek reported on the DA's investigation into its parent company, and its relationship with Olivet University. Following the publication of the story, several Newsweek staff were fired and some editors threatened to resign stating that management had tried to interfere in the story's publication (veteran IBT journalist Matthew Cooper did resign). On October 10, 2018, it was reported by the Wall Street Journal that IBT Media was charged with defrauding lenders.

In 2020 Uzac was convicted, pleading guilty to avoid jail time.

On July 6, 2022, a lawsuit was filed in New York state by Newsweek’s current owner, NW Media Holdings Corp., seeking to enforce IBT's "contractual obligation to indemnify NW Media Holdings for the multi-million-dollar losses incurred as a result of IBT's former mismanagement of Newsweek." In addition to Uzac, other named defendants include religious leader David Jang.

Additional lawsuits have been filed by Newsweek co-owners Johnathan Davis and Dev Pragad against each other, alleging various grievances including stolen trade secrets, records falsification and reputational damage.

=== Partnership with Olivet University ===
IBT Media has a partnership with Olivet University, which was founded by evangelical pastor David J. Jang. This partnership includes the school providing design assistance and computer resources, and IBT Media providing internships for students. It characterizes it as similar to the relationships Silicon Valley companies have with local universities. However, publication Christianity Today alleges that IBT Media has a close relationship both with Olivet and with its founder, controversial Christianity Today claims that Jang is an investor in and has exercised control over IBT Media, that Davis was formerly director of journalism at Olivet, and that Uzac was its treasurer, at least at one time. Executives characterize the relationship as between the institutions and not the founders, and that it was purely operational.

On June 30, 2022, the New York State Education Department officially ended Olivet's authorization to operate in the state citing that their failings "are part of a larger pattern of poor administration and addressing such problems only after being caught in a criminal conspiracy."
