= David Jang =

South Korean theologian (born 1949)

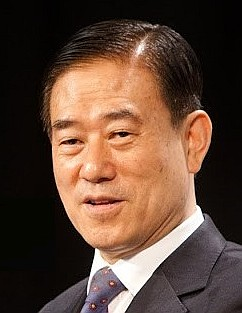
- Born: Jae‐Hyung Jang
- Education: B.Th., M.Div. Hanshin University; M.A. Yonsei University; Ph.D. Dankook University
- Occupations: Professor; Theologian; Minister
- Religion: Presbyterian Christian

David Jang is a South Korean professor, Christian theologian, and pastor. He has founded several Christian organizations, including Olivet University in San Francisco, Christian Today headquartered in Korea, Christian Daily Korea, and Christianity Daily in Los Angeles. He served as a member of the North American Council of the World Evangelical Alliance (WEA) from 2007 to 2018, the former president of World Olivet Assembly, the founder and first international president of Olivet University, and current president of the Holy Bible Society. Jang was also the 88th President of the General Assembly of the Presbyterian Church in Korea.

== Career ==
Jang grew up in South Korea in a Presbyterian family. As a young man he spent much time in Bible study, vigil prayer meetings, and evangelism. He pursued theological studies at Hanshin University and received two degrees, a Bachelor of Theology (B.Th.) and a Master of Divinity (M.Div.). He also earned an M.A. in Communications from Yonsei University and completed his formal studies with a Ph.D. in Public Administration of Social Welfare from Dankook University. While he was studying, Jang participated in missions and teaching, serving in campus fellowships and churches, and lectured in theology.

In a 2002 message, Jang argued that "the world has entered a modern deluge: instead of water, modern society is drowning in information. Information is everywhere, but there is no water to drink". Jang stated that in order to "rescue" society, his community would "build a new ark to raise the truth above the flood", including evangelical groups, Olivet University, and media outlets, supported by various business activities.

== Christian Today ==
In 2000, Jang founded Christian Today, which came to have the highest number of visitors among religious news websites in Korea. Jang aimed for the media company to provide "online in-depth coverage across all areas in Christianity, encourage a spirit of unity and reconciliation within the church, promote international recognition of Christian culture, and contribute to global mission work."

== Olivet University ==
In the year 2000, Olivet Theological College and Seminary (OTCS) was established in both Los Angeles and in Seoul, Korea, where it was co-located with the Southern Cross College Korea Campus. Jang was a member of the faculty of Southern Cross College and the first director of its Korea campus.

By 2004, the seminary expanded and incorporated into a university comprising five colleges - Olivet Theological College & Seminary, Jubilee College of Music, Olivet College of Journalism, Olivet College of Art & Design, and Olivet Institute of Technology - in the institution’s new home in San Francisco. The university moved into the former University of California, Berkeley Downtown Extension Campus, near the Moscone Center in 2005. They also founded Olivet Business School, which offers MBA programs and opened extension sites in Nashville, TN (at 141 Belle Forest Circle), New York City (at 6 Barclay Street in Lower Manhattan), San Francisco (at 1025 Howard Street), and Washington, D.C. (at 1400 Eye Street NW ). Olivet combines Winter's focus on training men and women in biblical scholarship and leadership with Jang’s emphasis on practical skills for preaching.

In 2006, Jang handed over the presidency of the university to Dr. David James Randolph in order to concentrate on mission field work. Jang continues to serve at Olivet University as a professor of theology and international president.

== Other activities ==
From 2007 to 2018, Jang served as a member of the North American Council of the WEA. Also in 2007, he began work with the Holy Bible Society whose mission is to make "the Bible more accessible to all people by using digital technology and the Internet, especially in unreached mission frontiers." Over the years, he has engaged in discussions about helping to establish churches in difficult mission fields such as China.

In 2012, a Christianity Today article raised questions whether Jang had any connections with the Unification Church and his being seen by some people as the "Second Coming of Christ", accusations that have been disputed as baseless by the Christian Council of Korea and the World Evangelical Alliance, among others. The Christian Post, founded by students from Olivet University, issued a detailed response to the various allegations raised in the Christianity Today article, raising doubts about the sources and also questioning the timing of the publication during a review of an offer Olivet University made to Lifeway for the purchase of a campus property.

== Personal life ==
Jang is married to Dr. Sarah Lee and has two sons. He considers Ralph D. Winter and Jang Sik Lee (이장식) among his mentors.
