= Audie Award for Nonfiction =

Literary award for audiobooks

The Audie Award for Nonfiction is one of the Audie Awards presented annually by the Audio Publishers Association (APA). It awards excellence in narration, production, and content for a nonfiction audiobook released in a given year. Before 2008 the award was given as the Audie Award for Unabridged Nonfiction. It has been awarded since 1996.

== Winners and finalists ==
=== 1990s ===
| Year | Audiobook | Author(s) | Narrator(s) | Publisher | Result | Ref. |
|---|---|---|---|---|---|---|
| 1996 1st | Amazing Grace: The Lives of Children and the Conscience of a Nation (1995) | Jonathan Kozol | Dick Hill | Brilliance Audio | Winner | |
| 1996 1st | Crossing the Threshold of Hope (1995) | Pope John Paul II | Earl Hammond and William Bogert | Random House Audio | Finalist | |
| 1996 1st | Lincoln's Letters: The Private Man and the Warrior (1995) | Abraham Lincoln | George Vail | Commuter's Library | Finalist | |
| 1997 2nd | Genesis (1996) | Bill Moyers | Mandy Patinkin | Bantam Doubleday Dell Audio | Winner | |
| 1997 2nd | Full House: The Spread of Excellence from Plato to Darwin (1996) | Stephen Jay Gould | Efrem Zimbalist, Jr. | Dove Audio | Finalist | |
| 1997 2nd | It Shouldn't Happen to a Vet (1972) | James Herriot | Christopher Timothy | Chivers North America | Finalist | |
| 1998 3rd | James Herriot's Animal Stories (1992) | James Herriot | Christopher Timothy | Audio Renaissance | Winner | |
| 1998 3rd | The Lord God Made Them All (1981) | James Herriot | Christopher Timothy | Chivers North America | Finalist | |
| 1998 3rd | Tuesdays with Morrie (1997) | Mitch Albom | Mitch Albom | Brilliance Audio | Finalist | |
| 1999 4th | Full Circle: A Pacific Journey with Michael Palin (1997) | Michael Palin | Michael Palin | Chivers North America | Winner | |
| 1999 4th | Ned Kelly: A Short Life (1995) | Ian Jones | Paul English | Australian Large Print Audio & Video | Finalist | |
| 1999 4th | White Coolies (1954) | Betty Jeffrey | Beverly Dunn | Australian Large Print Audio & Video | Finalist | |

=== 2000s ===
| Year | Audiobook | Author(s) | Narrator(s) | Publisher | Result | Ref. |
|---|---|---|---|---|---|---|
| 2000 5th | 'Tis (1999) | Frank McCourt | Frank McCourt | Simon & Schuster Audio | Winner | |
| 2000 5th | Elegy for Iris (1999) | John Bayley | David Frederick Case | Books on Tape | Finalist | |
| 2000 5th | The War Journal of Major Damon Rocky Gause (1999) | Damon Rocky Gause | Dick Hill | Brilliance Audio | Finalist | |
| 2001 6th | The Measure of a Man: A Spiritual Autobiography (2000) | Sidney Poitier | Sidney Poitier | HarperAudio | Winner | |
| 2001 6th | On Writing (2000) | Stephen King | Stephen King | Simon & Schuster | Finalist | |
| 2002 7th | John Adams (2001) | David McCullough | Nelson Runger | Recorded Books | Winner | |
| 2002 7th | An Album of Memories (2001) | Tom Brokaw | Tom Brokaw et al. | Random House Audio | Finalist | |
| 2002 7th | The Life and Works of Chopin (2001) | Jeremy Siepmann | Jeremy Siepmann | Naxos Audiobooks | Finalist | |
| 2003 8th | 3000 Degrees (2002) | Sean Flynn | Richard Rohan | Listen & Live Audio | Winner | |
| 2003 8th | Band of Brothers (1992) | Stephen E. Ambrose | Tim Jerome | BBC Audiobooks America | Finalist | |
| 2003 8th | Bin Laden: The Man Who Declared War on America (1999) | Yossef Bodansky | Nadia May | Blackstone Audio | Finalist | |
| 2003 8th | Mark Twain (2001) | Geoffrey C. Ward,Dayton Duncan, and Ken Burns | Bille Meisle | Random House Audio | Finalist | |
| 2003 8th | The Trial and The Death of Socrates (4th century B.C.) | Plato | Bruce Alexander and Jamie Glover | Naxos Audiobooks | Finalist | |
| 2004 9th | The Opposite of Fate: A Book of Musings (2003) | Amy Tan | Amy Tan | Brilliance Audio | Winner | |
| 2004 9th | The Devil in the White City (2003) | Erik Larson | Tony Goldwyn | Random House Audio | Finalist | |
| 2004 9th | Hitler's Scientists (2003) | John Cornwell | Simon Prebble | Listen & Live Audio | Finalist | |
| 2004 9th | Middletown, America (2003) | Gail Sheehy | Gail Sheehy | Brilliance | Finalist | |
| 2004 9th | The Bounty (2003) | Caroline Alexander | Michael York | Penguin Audiobooks | Finalist | |
| 2005 10th | Chasing the Devil (1997) | David Reichert | Dennis Boutsikaris | Time Warner AudioBooks | Winner | |
| 2005 10th | Ask Not (2004) | Thurston Clarke | Edward Herrmann | Audio Renaissance | Finalist | |
| 2005 10th | Caddy for Life (2004) | John Feinstein | John Feinstein | Time Warner AudioBooks | Finalist | |
| 2005 10th | The Culture of Fear (1999) | Barry Glassner | Barry Glassner | The Audio Partners | Finalist | |
| 2005 10th | Running with the Bulls (2004) | Valerie Hemingway | Anne Flosnik | Brilliance Audio | Finalist | |
| 2005 10th | They Made America (2004) | Harold Evans, Gail Buckland, and David Lefer | Harold Evans | Time Warner AudioBooks | Finalist | |
| 2006 11th | The World Is Flat (2005) | Thomas L. Friedman | Oliver Wyman | Audio Renaissance | Winner | |
| 2006 11th | The Boys of Pointe du Hoc (2005) | Douglas Brinkley | Douglas Brinkley | HarperAudio | Finalist | |
| 2006 11th | Conspiracy of Fools (2005) | Kurt Eichenwald | Stephen Lang | Random House Audio | Finalist | |
| 2006 11th | A Crack in the Edge of the World (2005) | Simon Winchester | Simon Winchester | HarperAudio | Finalist | |
| 2006 11th | The Truth (with Jokes) (2005) | Al Franken | Al Franken | Brilliance Audio | Finalist | |
| 2007 12th | Narrow Dog to Carcassonne (2004) | Terry Darlington | Steve Hodson | IFIS Publishing | Winner | |
| 2007 12th | Babylon by Bus (2006) | Ray LeMoine, Jeff Neumann, and Donovan Webster | Jeremy Davidson | Penguin Audiobooks | Finalist | |
| 2007 12th | Striking Back (2005) | Aaron J. Klein | Stefan Rudnicki | Blackstone Audio | Finalist | |
| 2007 12th | Team of Rivals (2005) | Doris Kearns Goodwin | Suzanne Toren | Recorded Books | Finalist | |
| 2007 12th | The Looming Tower (2006) | Lawrence Wright | Alan Sklar | Tantor Audio | Finalist | |
| 2008 13th | Roots: The Saga of an American Family (1976) | Alex Haley | Avery Brooks | BBC Audiobooks America | Winner | |
| 2008 13th | Banker to the Poor (2006) | Muhammad Yunus | Ray Porter | Blackstone Audio | Finalist | |
| 2008 13th | The Coldest Winter: America and the Korean War (2007) | David Halberstam | Edward Herrmann | Hyperion Audiobooks | Finalist | |
| 2008 13th | Endurance: Shackleton's Incredible Voyage (1959) | Alfred Lansing | Simon Prebble | Blackstone Audio | Finalist | |
| 2008 13th | Jesus for the Non-Religious (2007) | John Shelby Spong | Alan Sklar | HarperAudio | Finalist | |
| 2009 14th | Hot, Flat, and Crowded (2008) | Thomas Friedman | Oliver Wyman | Macmillan Audio | Winner | |
| 2009 14th | Abraham Lincoln, a Man of Faith and Courage (2008) | Joe Wheeler | Grover Gardner | Oasis Audio | Finalist | |
| 2009 14th | Buying In (2008) | Rob Walker | Robert Fass | BBC Audiobooks America | Finalist | |
| 2009 14th | Gang Leader for a Day (2008) | Sudhir Venkatesh | Reg Rogers | HarperAudio | Finalist | |
| 2009 14th | Out of Mao's Shadows (2008) | Philip P. Pan | David Colacci | Tantor Audio | Finalist | |

=== 2010s ===
| Year | Audiobook | Author(s) | Narrator(s) | Publisher | Result | Ref. |
|---|---|---|---|---|---|---|
| 2010 15th | The National Parks: America's Best Idea (2009) | Ken Burns and Dayton Duncan | Ken Burns and Dayton Duncan | Random House Audio | Winner | |
| 2010 15th | Anne Frank Remembered (1995) | Miep Gies and Leslie Gold | Barbara Rosenblat | Oasis Audio | Finalist | |
| 2010 15th | Columbine (2009) | Dave Cullen | Don Leslie | Blackstone Audio | Finalist | |
| 2010 15th | Outliers (2008) | Malcolm Gladwell | Malcolm Gladwell | Hachette Audio | Finalist | |
| 2010 15th | What Americans Really Want…Really (2009) | Frank Luntz | L. J. Ganser | Hyperion Audio | Finalist | |
| 2011 16th | The Immortal Life of Henrietta Lacks (2010) | Rebecca Skloot | Cassandra Campbell and Bahni Turpin | Random House Audio | Winner | |
| 2011 16th | No One Would Listen (2010) | Harry Markopolos | Harry Markopolos, Frank Casey, Neil Chelo, David Kotz, Gaytri Kachroo, and Michael Ocrant | Audible | Finalist | |
| 2011 16th | Game Change (2010) | John Heilemann and Mark Halperin | Dennis Boutsikaris | HarperAudio | Finalist | |
| 2011 16th | Obama's Wars (2010) | Bob Woodward | Boyd Gaines | Simon & Schuster Audio | Finalist | |
| 2011 16th | The Poisoner's Handbook (2010) | Deborah Blum | Coleen Marlo | Tantor Audio | Finalist | |
| 2012 17th | The Murder of the Century | Paul Collins | William Dufris | AudioGO | Winner | |
| 2012 17th | Dog Sense (2011) | John Bradshaw | Michael Page | Tantor Audio | Finalist | |
| 2012 17th | The 4 Percent Universe (2011) | Richard Panek | Ray Porter | Blackstone Audio | Finalist | |
| 2012 17th | My Korean Deli (2010) | Ben Ryder Howe | Bronson Pinchot | Blackstone Audio | Finalist | |
| 2012 17th | Unbroken (2010) | Laura Hillenbrand | Edward Herrmann | Random House Audio/Books on Tape | Finalist | |
| 2013 18th | Breasts: A Natural and Unnatural History (2012) | Florence Williams | Kate Reading | Tantor Audio | Winner | |
| 2013 18th | Cemetery John (2012) | Robert Zorn | Sean Runnette | Tantor Audio | Finalist | |
| 2013 18th | The Crisis of Zionism (2012) | Peter Beinart | Lloyd James | Tantor Audio | Finalist | |
| 2013 18th | Love Is the Cure (2012) | Elton John | Elton John | Hachette Audio | Finalist | |
| 2013 18th | Sex and God at Yale (2012) | Nathan Harden | Scott Aiello | Audible | Finalist | |
| 2014 19th | David and Goliath (2013) | Malcolm Gladwell | Malcolm Gladwell | Hachette Audio | Winner | |
| 2014 19th | Beyond Belief (2013) | Jenna Miscavige Hill | Sandy Rustin | HarperAudio | Finalist | |
| 2014 19th | The End of Nature (1989) | Bill McKibben | Jeff Woodman | Audible | Finalist | |
| 2014 19th | The Telling Room (2013) | Michael Paterniti | L. J. Ganser | Audible | Finalist | |
| 2014 19th | Thank You for Your Service (2013) | David Finkel | Arthur Bishop | Macmillan Audio | Finalist | |
| 2015 20th | Furious Cool: Richard Pryor and the World That Made Him (2013) | David Henry and Joe Henry | Dion Graham | Tantor Audio | Winner | |
| 2015 20th | Being Mortal (2014) | Atul Gawande | Robert Petkoff | Macmillan Audio | Finalist | |
| 2015 20th | Deep Down Dark (2014) | Héctor Tobar | Henry Leyva | Macmillan Audio | Finalist | |
| 2015 20th | Flash Boys (2014) | Michael Lewis | Dylan Baker | Simon & Schuster Audio | Finalist | |
| 2015 20th | The Innovators: How a Group of Inventors, Hackers, Geniuses, and Geeks Created the Digital Revolution (2014) | Walter Isaacson | Dennis Boutsikaris | Simon & Schuster Audio | Finalist | |
| 2015 20th | Unruly Places (2014) | Alastair Bonnett | Derek Perkins | Tantor Audio | Finalist | |
| 2016 21st | Ghettoside (2015) | Jill Leovy | Rebecca Lowman | Books on Tape/Penguin Random House Audio | Winner | |
| 2016 21st | The Dorito Effect (2015) | Mark Schatzker | Chris Patton | Dreamscape | Finalist | |
| 2016 21st | I Wasn't Strong Like This When I Started Out (2013) | Lee Gutkind | Tavia Gilbert | Tantor Audio | Finalist | |
| 2016 21st | Missoula (2015) | Jon Krakauer | Mozhan Marno | Books on Tape/Penguin Random House Audio | Finalist | |
| 2016 21st | The Song Machine (2015) | John Seabrook | Dion Graham | HighBridge Audio/Recorded Books | Finalist | |
| 2017 22nd | Hillbilly Elegy (2016) | JD Vance | JD Vance | HarperAudio | Winner | |
| 2017 22nd | Adnan's Story (2016) | Rabia Chaudry | Rabia Chaudry | Macmillan Audio | Finalist | |
| 2017 22nd | Evicted: Poverty and Profit in the American City (2016) | Matthew Desmond | Dion Graham | Penguin Random House Audio/Books on Tape | Finalist | |
| 2017 22nd | The Gene: An Intimate History (2016) | Siddhartha Mukherjee | Dennis Boutsikaris | Simon & Schuster Audio | Finalist | |
| 2017 22nd | A Million Years in a Day (2015) | Greg Jenner | Matthew Lloyd Davies | Tantor Audio (Recorded Books) | Finalist | |
| 2017 22nd | Words on the Move: Why English Won't – and Can't – Sit Still (Like, Literally) (2016) | John McWhorter | John McWhorter | Audible | Finalist | |
| 2018 23rd | American Wolf (2017) | Nate Blakeslee | Mark Bramhall | Random House Audio | Winner | |
| 2018 23rd | The Butterfly Effect (2017) | Jon Ronson | Jon Ronson | Audible Originals | Finalist | |
| 2018 23rd | Ghosts of the Tsunami (2017) | Richard Lloyd Parry | Simon Vance | Macmillan Audio | Finalist | |
| 2018 23rd | Shattered: Inside Hillary Clinton's Doomed Campaign (2017) | Jonathan Allen and Amie Parnes | Kimberly Farr | Random House Audio | Finalist | |
| 2018 23rd | This Fight Is Our Fight (2017) | Elizabeth Warren | Elizabeth Warren | Macmillan Audio | Finalist | |
| 2019 24th | The Perfectionists | Simon Winchester | Simon Winchester | HarperAudio | Winner | |
| 2019 24th | The Cadaver King and the Country Dentist (2018) | Radley Balko and Tucker Carrington | Robert Fass | Hachette Audio | Finalist | |
| 2019 24th | Dopesick (2018) | Beth Macy | Beth Macy | Hachette Audio | Finalist | |
| 2019 24th | Eager: The Surprising, Secret Life of Beavers and Why They Matter (2018) | Ben Goldfarb | Will Damron | Chelsea Green Publishing | Finalist | |
| 2019 24th | Heartland (2018) | Sarah Smarsh | Sarah Smarsh | Simon & Schuster Audio | Finalist | |
| 2019 24th | Where Do We Go from Here: Chaos or Community? (1967) | Martin Luther King, Jr. | JD Jackson | Beacon Press Audio | Finalist | |

=== 2020s ===
| Year | Audiobook | Author(s) | Narrator | Publisher | Result | Ref. |
|---|---|---|---|---|---|---|
| 2020 25th | Grace Will Lead Us Home (2019) | Jennifer Berry Hawes | Karen Chilton and Jennifer Berry Hawes | Macmillan Audio | Winner | |
| 2020 25th | Mama's Last Hug (2019) | Frans de Waal | L. J. Ganser | Recorded Books | Finalist | |
| 2020 25th | The Perfect Predator (2019) | Steffanie Strathdee, Thomas Patterson, and Teresa Barker | Christine Lakin and Dan Woren | Hachette Audio | Finalist | |
| 2020 25th | Talking to Strangers (2019) | Malcolm Gladwell | Malcolm Gladwell | Hachette Audio | Finalist | |
| 2020 25th | We Are the Weather (2019) | Jonathan Safran Foer | Jonathan Safran Foer | Macmillan Audio | Finalist | |
| 2021 26th | Fire in Paradise (2020) | Alastair Gee and Dani Anguiano | T. Ryder Smith | Recorded Books | Winner | |
| 2021 26th | If You Tell (2019) | Gregg Olsen | Karen Peakes | Brilliance | Finalist | |
| 2021 26th | Rage (2020) | Bob Woodward | Robert Petkoff | Simon & Schuster Audio | Finalist | |
| 2021 26th | Tightrope: Americans Reaching for Hope (2020) | Nicholas D. Kristof and Sheryl WuDunn | Jennifer Garner | Penguin Random House Audio | Finalist | |
| 2021 26th | Wandering in Strange Lands (2020) | Morgan Jerkins | Morgan Jerkins | HarperAudio | Finalist | |
| 2022 27th | The Joy of Sweat | Sarah Everts | Sophie Amoss | Penguin Random House Audio | Winner | |
| 2022 27th | Freedom | Sebastian Junger | Sebastian Junger | Simon & Schuster Audio | Finalist | |
| 2022 27th | Last Call | Elon Green | David Pittu | Macmillan Audio | Finalist | |
| 2022 27th | The Menopause Manifesto: Own Your Health with Facts and Feminism | Jen Gunter | Jen Gunter | HighBridge Audio, a division of Recorded Books | Finalist | |
| 2022 27th | The Premonition: A Pandemic Story | Michael Lewis | Adenrele Ojo | Audible Studios | Finalist | |
| 2022 27th | This Is Your Mind on Plants | Michael Pollan | Michael Pollan | Penguin Random House Audio | Finalist | |
| 2023 27th | The Ransomware Hunting Team (2022) | Renee Dudley and Daniel Golden | BD Wong | Macmillan Audio | Winner | |
| 2023 27th | Davos Man | Peter S. Goodman | Michael David Axtell | HarperAudio | Finalist | |
| 2023 27th | Queer Ducks (And Other Animals) | Eliot Schrefer | Joel Froomkin, Dustin Ballard, Hope Newhouse, and Neo Cihi | HarperAudio | Finalist | |
| 2023 27th | The Sex Lives of African Women | Nana Darkoa Sekyiamah | Iesha Nyree, Adenrele Ojo, Deanna Anthony, Stephanie Weeks, Joy Hooper, Lisa Reneé Pitts, Karen Murray, Joniece Abbott-Pratt, Janina Edwards, M. J. Brown, and Karla Mosley | Blackstone Audio | Finalist | |
| 2023 27th | The Soul of the Indian: An Interpretation | Charles Alexander Eastman (Ohiyesa) | Shaun Taylor-Corbett | Brilliance Publishing | Finalist | |
| 2024 29th | Poverty, by America (2023) | Matthew Desmond | Dion Graham | Penguin Random House Audio | Winner | |
| 2024 29th | Fire Weather | John Vaillant | Alan Carlson | Penguin Random House Audio | Finalist | |
| 2024 29th | Shakespeare Was a Woman and Other Heresies (2023) | Elizabeth Winkler | Eunice Wong | Simon & Schuster Audio | Finalist | |
| 2024 29th | Punished for Dreaming: How School Reform Harms Black Children and How We Heal | Bettina L. Love | Karen Chilton, introduction read by Bettina L. Love | Macmillan Audio | Finalist | |
| 2024 29th | A Refugee's American Dream: From the Killing Fields of Cambodia to the U.S. Secret Service | Leth Oun, contribution by Joe Samuel Starnes | Tim Lounibos | Tantor Audio | Finalist | |
| 2025 30th | There’s Always This Year | Hanif Abdurraqib | Hanif Abdurraqib | Penguin Random House Audio | Winner | |
| 2025 30th | Cool Food | Robert Downey Jr. and Tom Kostigan | Robert Downey Jr., Tom Kostigan, and Deepti Gupta | Blackstone Publishing | Finalist | |
| 2025 30th | The Situation Room | George Stephanopoulos and Lisa Dickey | George Stephanopoulos, Peter Ganim, and Elisabeth Rodgers | Hachette Audio | Finalist | |
| 2025 30th | This Is Not a Game | Marc Fennell | Marc Fennell | Audible Originals | Finalist | |
| 2025 30th | When Women Ran Fifth Avenue: Glamour and Power at the Dawn of American Fashion | Julie Satow | Karen Murray | Random House Audio | Finalist | |
| 2026 31st | Separation of Church and Hate | John Fugelsang | John Fugelsang | Simon & Schuster Audio | Winner | |
| 2026 31st | Death in the Jungle | Candace Fleming | Karen Murray | Penguin Random House Audio | Finalist | |
| 2026 31st | Everything Is Tuberculosis (2025) | John Green | John Green | Penguin Random House Audio | Finalist | |
| 2026 31st | A Fine Line Between Stupid and Clever | Rob Reiner, Christopher Guest, Michael McKean, and Harry Shearer | Rob Reiner, Christopher Guest, Michael McKean, and Harry Shearer | Simon & Schuster Audio | Finalist | |
| 2026 31st | On the Hippie Trail | Rick Steves | Rick Steves | Hachette Audio | Finalist | |
