= Babylon by Bus (disambiguation) =

Babylon by Bus is a 1978 live album by Bob Marley and the Wailers

Babylon by Bus may also refer to:

- Babylon by Bus (book), 2006 book by Ray Lemoine and Jeff Neumann
- "Babylon by Bus", a 2023 song by Billy Woods and Kenny Segal, featuring ShrapKnel, from Maps
