= Abolitionist teaching =

Abolitionist teaching, also known as abolitionist pedagogy, is a set of practices and approaches to teaching that emphasize abolishing educational practices considered by its proponents to be inherently problematic and oppressive. The term was coined by education professor and critical theorist Bettina Love.

Proponents of the approach have criticized test-taking and prohibitions on cheating, as well as deemphasize traditional literacy and math improvement programs. Private organizations working under the banner of abolitionist teaching have stirred controversy bringing progressive politics and activism into classrooms, which includes promoting anti-police, anti-capitalism and anti-Zionist viewpoints.

== Concept ==
Abolitionist teaching has its roots in critical pedagogy, intersectional feminism and abolitionist action. It is defined as the commitment to pursue educational freedom and fight for an education system where students thrive, rather than just survive. Love further notes that it is a necessary complement to critical pedagogy, as pedagogy is most effective when paired with teachers who fight for student equality and justice. This teaching method is intended to combat systemic oppression, racial violence, the school-to-prison pipeline, reliance on test taking and all other parts of a system Bettina Love calls the "educational survival complex." Other parts of the system that the practice is intended to combat is cheating, as Drs. Lore/tta LeMaster and Meggie Mapes note that "Rather than punitive measures, abolitionist pedagogy requires rethinking how narratives of cheating perform and to what and whose ends such narratives serve."

Some scholars, such as Denise Blum, have argued for a neo-abolitionist pedagogy in educational institutions, a "'third space' to process emotional responses and discuss social positionalities to prevent unproductive feelings of guilt or pity that function to further otherize immigrants."

== Theoretical, historical and activist context ==
Abolitionist teaching is inspired by Black feminist theory, abolitionist theory and direct action. The term can be traced to Bettina L. Love's 2019 work We Want to Do More Than Survive: Abolitionist Teaching and the Pursuit of Educational Freedom. Love, the William F. Russell Professor at Teachers College, Columbia University, defines abolitionist teaching as teaching with the goal of intersectional social justice for equitable classrooms that love and affirm Black and brown children. She co-founded the Abolitionist Teaching Network (ATN) in 2020, which empowers teachers and parents to fight injustice within their schools.

Abolitionist teaching resides at the intersection between education, race, abolition and Black joy. It is heavily influenced by intersectionality, which is a framework that focuses on how the intersection of a person's multiple identities influences the privilege or discrimination they experience. Some of these traits include gender, sexuality, race, ethnicity, nationality, religion and disability. Intersectionality is a theory coined by Kimberlé Crenshaw in 1989 in her paper "Demarginalizing the Intersection of Race and Sex: A Black Feminist Critique of Anti-discrimination Doctrine, Feminist Theory and Antiracist Politics." Crenshaw has revisited this theme in multiple subsequent papers and discussions.

Abolitionist teachings grows out of the prison abolition movement, which comes from the abolitionist movement. The abolitionist movement was the worldwide effort to end the trans-Atlantic slave trade and free enslaved peoples from bondage. There was no leader of this movement, as there were many groups in many different countries that worked to end slavery over a period of over one hundred years. In the United States, the abolition movement culminated in the Civil War. Though the trans-Atlantic slave trade is no more, there are many global movements aimed at abolishing unjust systems that are part of the tradition of abolition.

The prison abolition movement sees the prison system as a new form of slavery that must be abolished in order for oppressed communities to be freed. Political activist and scholar Angela Davis' is a major figure in the prison abolition movement, which influences abolitionist teaching. She co-founded Critical Resistance, an organization focused on abolishing the prison system. In 2001 article "Race, Gender, and the Prison Industrial Complex: California and Beyond," Davis and co-author Shaylor launch a strong critique of the US prison-industrial complex that includes data on the human rights abuses of women, people of color and the poor in prisons. This framework applies directly to other oppressive systems, like education, that govern members of society. This draws on the Foucauldian notion that discipline evolves over time, both in the penal system and in schools.

The feminist and scholar bell hooks' work also influences abolitionist teaching. bell hooks' seminal 1994 book, Teaching to Transgress: Education as the Practice of Freedom, encourages educators to teach students to "transgress" racial and class boundaries in order to pursue freedom. She also published Teaching Community: A Pedagogy of Hope in 2004. In this book, as in Teaching to Transgress, hooks advises teachers to make the classroom life-sustaining, joyful and expansive. She encourages students and teachers to work in partnership, in order to mutually liberate one another.

bell hooks is deeply influenced by Brazilian educator Paulo Freire, whose book Pedagogy of the Oppressed excoriated the "banking model of education" and proposed a critical pedagogy to engage students as co-creators of knowledge. He argues that through education students can awaken critical consciousness, or conscientização, that will empower them to make change in their communities.

Freire and his legacy are the cornerstone of the field of Critical Pedagogy, of which abolitionist teaching is a part.

== See also ==
- Bettina L. Love
- Abolition
- Critical pedagogy
- Anti-bias curriculum
- Anti-oppressive education
- Social justice
- Black feminism
- Anti-racism
- Kimberlé Crenshaw
