= Barry Glassner =

Professor of sociology and author

- Born: 1952 (age 73–74); Roanoke, Virginia, U.S.
- Education: Northwestern University (BA); Washington University in St. Louis (MA, PhD)
- Occupations: Sociologist; writer
- Notable work: The Culture of Fear
- Spouse: Betsy Amster
- Website: www.barryglassner.com

Barry Glassner (born 1952) is an American professor of sociology and author or co-author of nine books, including The Culture of Fear, which discussed the culture of fear phenomenon. He is a former president at Lewis & Clark College.

== Early life ==
Glassner was born in 1952. His mother was a kindergarten teacher and his father ran a jewelry store. He grew up in Roanoke, Virginia. He received a B.A. from Northwestern University and an M.A. and Ph.D. from Washington University in St. Louis.

== Career ==
Glassner is a professor of sociology and author or co-author of nine books, including The Culture of Fear, which discussed the culture of fear phenomenon. He says that many of Americans' concerns and fears are largely unfounded. In it, Glassner decries: "The use of poignant anecdotes in place of scientific evidence, the christening of isolated incidents as trends, depictions of entire categories of people as innately dangerous ... " A new and enlarged edition updated for the Trump era was published in late 2018. In the years since, Glassner discussed the new edition on CNN's "Reliable Sources" program and Comedy Central's "Jim Jeffries Show." He applied the book's analysis to the Covid pandemic as well.

His scholarly articles have been published in journals including the American Sociological Review, Social Problems, American Journal of Psychiatry, and Journal of Health and Social Behavior. His essays on social issues and on higher education have appeared in national newspapers including the Wall Street Journal, Washington Post, Chronicle of Higher Education, The New York Times and Los Angeles Times.

Glassner argues in The Gospel of Food (released in hardcover in January 2007 and paperback in January 2008) that much of what Americans read and hear about food is inaccurate and unhelpful. He discussed this topic in depth in his interview on the Skeptics' Guide podcast. Michael Moore interviewed him in the film Bowling for Columbine. Some statistics cited by Moore and a story about President George W. Bush mentioned in the film are from Glassner's writings.

Glassner has appeared on numerous television programs, including “The Today Show,” “Good Morning America,” “The Oprah Winfrey Show,” and various news programs on CNN, CNBC, and MSNBC, and on radio shows on the BBC, CBC, and National Public Radio's “Morning Edition,” “All Things Considered,” “Fresh Air,” “Talk of the Nation,” and “Marketplace." In 2019, Glassner co-hosted 28 episodes of a podcast titled “Fear Not” alongside comedian Alonzo Bodden. The hosts used research and humor to debunk fearmongering by politicians and media.

The former president at Lewis & Clark College, Glassner was previously professor of sociology and executive vice provost at the University of Southern California. He has received USC's highest award for research excellence, a Phi Kappa Phi Faculty Recognition Award, a visiting fellowship at Oxford University and "best book" designations from the Los Angeles Times book review, Choice magazine and Knight Ridder newspapers. His research specialties include cultural sociology, qualitative methods and media studies.

Glassner was appointed executive vice provost at USC in June 2005, following terms as chair of the Department of Sociology and as Myron and Marian Casden Director of USC's Casden Institute for the Study of the Jewish Role in American Life. He served on USC's Development Committee, Provost's Advisory Committee and Budget Advisory Committee, among others. Glassner was chair of academic departments at Syracuse University and the University of Connecticut prior to arriving at USC. He serves on the advisory board of GettingBetter Foundation and is a founding Network Member of The Progress Network.

Since 2020, Glassner has done executive coaching for CEOs and other senior leaders at major American universities and national associations.

== Personal life ==
Glassner is a magician member of the Magic Castle, where he is a member of the Diversity and Inclusion Committee. His interest in magic dates back to his childhood, and as a teenager, he was president of Magical Youths International.

He is married to literary agent Betsy Amster.

== Books ==
- Clinical Sociology (written with Jonathan A. Freedman, 1979)
- Essential Interactionism (1980)
- Discourse in the Social Sciences (written with Jonathan D. Moreno, 1981)
- A Rationalist Methodology for the Social Sciences (written with David Sylvan, 1985)
- Drugs in Adolescent Worlds (written with Julia Loughlin, 1987)
- Bodies (1988)
- Career Crash (1994)
- The Culture of Fear (1999)
- Qualitative Sociology as Everyday Life (edited with Rosanna Hertz, 1999)
- Our Studies, Ourselves (edited with Rosanna Hertz, 2003)
- The Gospel of Food (2007)
