= Being Jewish After the Destruction of Gaza =

2025 book by Peter Beinart

- Author: Peter Beinart
- Subject: 2023 Hamas attack on Israel, Gaza war, Antisemitism
- Genre: Political journalism
- Publisher: Knopf
- Publication date: January 28, 2025
- Pages: 192
- ISBN: 978-0-593-80389-9

Being Jewish After the Destruction of Gaza: A Reckoning is a 2025 book by American journalist and professor Peter Beinart, published by Knopf. It is an appeal for American Jews to reckon with Israel's conduct in the Gaza war. He argues they must reject what Beinart describes as a narrative of permanent Jewish victimhood that, in his view, has enabled the American Jewish community to ignore Palestinian suffering. It debuted on the New York Times Best Sellers list for Hardcover Nonfiction in February 2025.

== Background ==
Peter Beinart is a professor of journalism and political science at the Craig Newmark Graduate School of Journalism at City University of New York, editor-at-large of Jewish Currents, and a contributing opinion writer at The New York Times. He was formerly the editor of The New Republic and was long known as a prominent liberal Zionist voice. Over the preceding decade, however, he distanced himself from a two-state solution and, ultimately, from Zionism altogether. In 2020, he publicly advocated for a single democratic state with equal rights for Israelis and Palestinians.

The book opens with a "Note to My Former Friend," addressed to someone with whom Beinart has broken over the question of Israel's conduct in Gaza. Beinart has described the book as coming out of his struggles within a community he loves but from which he has felt increasingly at odds.

== Content ==
The book, 172 pages of text plus endnotes, is a series of linked essays drawing on Jewish religious texts, history, and personal memoir. Its central argument is that Jewish communal life in America has come to be organized around a narrative of perpetual victimhood rooted in the history of antisemitism and the Holocaust. Beinart argues that this functions as a set of defense mechanisms which allow American Jews to ignore or rationalize Palestinian suffering. He characterizes this as a form of "false innocence" that he writes "camouflages domination as self-defense" and "offers infinite license to fallible human beings."

Beinart does not minimize the October 7 attacks, calling Hamas a "corrupt and despotic organization with a long history of brutality against both Israelis and Palestinians," and describing the Hamas attack as a genuine horror. He argues, however, that Israel's response in Gaza constitutes mass violence that the organized American Jewish community has enabled through its unconditional support for Israel.

A theme is Beinart's argument that Israel does not have an unconditional "right to exist as a Jewish state." He draws on the thinking of Israeli philosopher Yeshayahu Leibowitz to argue that states have only conditional value as instruments for protecting human life. He argues for a single democratic state with equal rights for Israelis and Palestinians, drawing comparisons to post-apartheid South Africa and the Good Friday Agreement in Northern Ireland as examples of divided societies in which legal equality reduced rather than increased violence. The book draws extensively on Jewish scripture and tradition to argue that support for Jewish supremacy in Israel is a form of idolatry, and that the Jewish tradition at its best is incompatible with a system of legal privilege based on ethnicity.

Beinart also addresses the organized American Jewish community's use of antisemitism accusations to suppress criticism of Israel, arguing that this practice both cheapens the concept of antisemitism and endangers Jews by conflating Jewish identity with support for Israeli policy.

== Reception ==
The Sydney Morning Herald called the book "brilliant, painful" for the scholarly way Beinart approaches the complexity of the issues, and praised its treatment of the correlation between Israeli military operations and the rise in antisemitism. The National Catholic Reporter described the book as a publication making "a new Jewish narrative" necessary and praised it as a work of commentary, meditation, memoir, and Biblical exegesis. In The New York Review of Books, historian Omer Bartov drew extensively on Beinart's framing of Jewish "false innocence" to analyze the broader Western response to Gaza. Bartov described Beinart's argument about "infinite license" as among the more powerful formulations of the moral stakes of the war. In The New Yorker, Isaac Chotiner conducted an extended interview in which he explored Beinart's arguments about the failure of American liberal Zionism, the impossibility of the two-state solution, and the relationship between Zionism and ethnonationalism. The Guardian characterized Beinart as having shed the preconceptions he was raised with and called the book an appeal to his fellow Jews to undertake the same process of "unpeeling." The New York Times framed Beinart as having "been one of the most influential Jewish voices for Palestine, even as he continues to attend a predominantly Zionist Orthodox synagogue," and called his method of confronting Jewish communal mythology "as much scriptural as it is political."

Middle East Eye criticized Beinart's approach which "treats Zionism as a given, erases historical Jewish opposition to the racist ideology, and gives credence to a Jewish claim over Palestine." The review argued that his framework offers Jewish Zionists "a blueprint for an escape from accountability."

Reviewed alongside Adam Kirsch's On Settler Colonialism, Moment Magazine argued that Beinart "reinforces his reputation in recent years as aggregator-in-chief of every possible anti-Israel position" and that his work would be more compelling if it acknowledged the challenges posed by an adversary that openly seeks Israel's destruction.

Being Jewish After the Destruction of Gaza is "a handbook filled with skewed anti-Israel, anti-Jewish arguments," in the words of The Jerusalem Post, which argued that Beinart "entirely fails to appreciate that the establishment of Israel was not a political demonstration of Jewish colonial arrogance but a lifeline for Jews fleeing constant pogroms, widespread discrimination, and finally the aftermath of the Holocaust."

Prospect offered a nuanced assessment which acknowledged the book's intellectual courage and its ability to pursue "the awkward nuances of liberalism to the point where most liberals would run for cover." However, they argued Beinart's approach was ultimately "over-inflating the importance of Israel-Palestine" with quasi-millenarian language about the fate of the world depending on Jewish moral transformation.

=== Influence on Jewish communal discourse ===
In October 2025, a number of prominent rabbis and scholars, including the chancellor emeritus of the Jewish Theological Seminary Rabbi Ismar Schorsch, had cited the book's themes in warning that Israel's conduct in Gaza threatened to "saddle Jews with a repulsive religion riddled with hypocrisy."

In July 2025, Beinart appeared on The Daily Show with Jon Stewart, in what the Jewish Telegraphic Agency called "a kind of Jewish soul-searching rare on such public platforms," with the two discussing the failure of American Jewish institutions to hold Israel to account and the internal divisions among American Jews over the war.

According to The Forward, the book was an effort to "disrupt the often-automatic thought patterns and reactions of American Jews about Israel." They highlighted Beinart's argument that the American Jewish community "doesn't really have any moral red lines when it comes to Israel's treatment of the Palestinians."

== Sales ==
The book debuted on the New York Times Best Sellers list for Hardcover Nonfiction for the week of February 16, 2025.
