= Winkleigh =

Village in Devon, England

Coordinates: 50.85°N 3.95°W

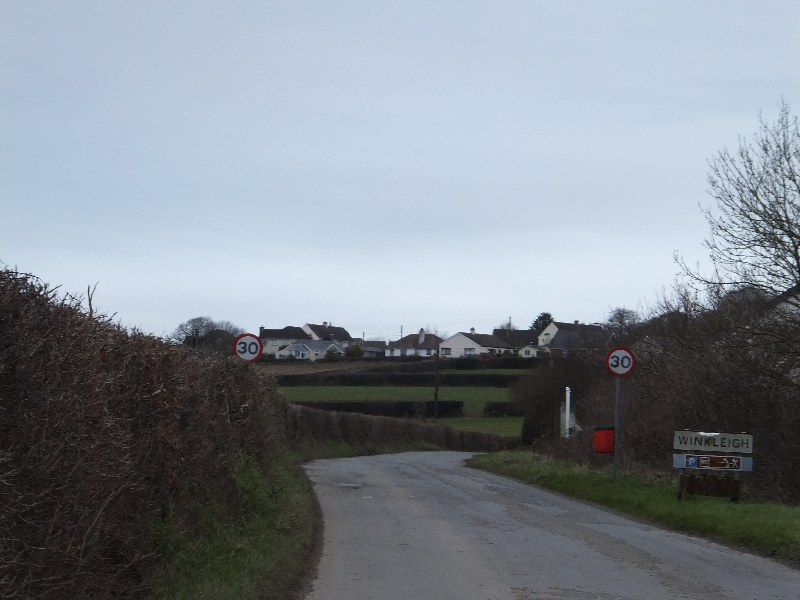
- View of the edge of Winkleigh

- Location within Devon
- Population: 1,305 (2011)
- OS grid reference: SS6309
- Civil parish: Winkleigh
- District: Torridge
- Shire county: Devon
- Region: South West
- Country: England
- Sovereign state: United Kingdom
- Post town: WINKLEIGH
- Postcode district: EX19
- Dialling code: 01837
- Police: Devon and Cornwall
- Fire: Devon and Somerset
- Ambulance: South Western
- UK Parliament: Torridge and Tavistock

Winkleigh is a civil parish and small village in Devon, England. It is part of the local government area of Torridge District Council. The population of the parish at the 2011 census was 1,305, compared to 1,079 in 1901. The population of the electoral ward in 2011 was 2,068.

== History ==
During World War II, the RAF Winkleigh Airfield was used by the RNoAF from 1944 as the main training Centre in the UK after Norway shifted from Little Norway in Toronto Canada to re-locate the training facilities to a place nearer to the War theatre. The former RAF base is now the site of the West of England Transport Collection, which stores over 200 cars, lorries and buses of historical interest. It is not normally open to the public.

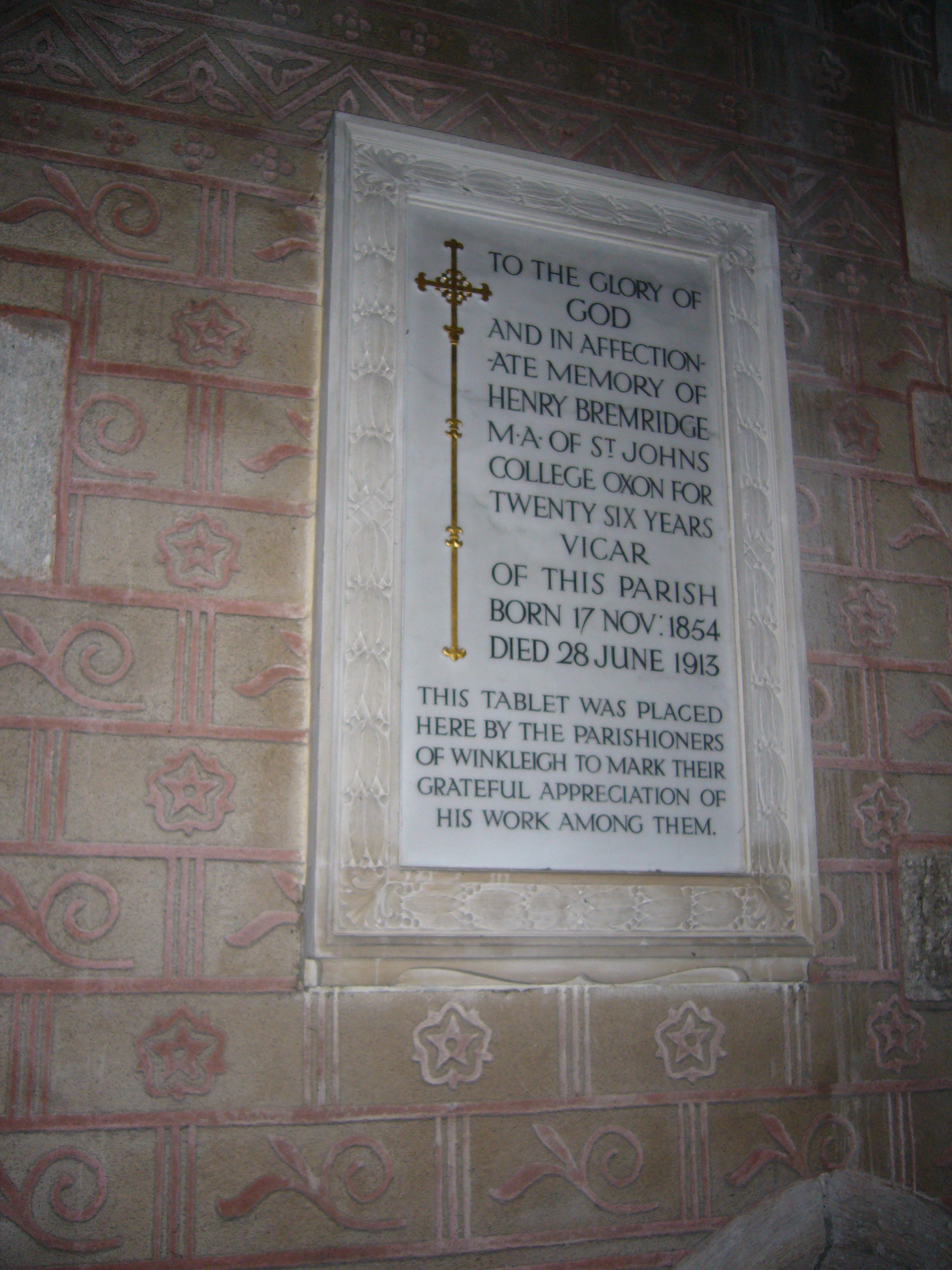
Memorial tablet to Henry Bremridge, vicar of Church of All Saints, Winkleigh for 26 years, succeeding his father

In 1975 the deaths of three members of the Luxton family at nearby West Chapple Farm, brought media interest to the area. A book Earth to Earth by John Cornwell was published about this murder and suicide case in 1982.

The village was the location of Inch's Cider, producers of White Lightning cider. Inch's Cider was bought by H. P. Bulmer, who then closed the plant down. However some of those involved in the original enterprise now run Winkleigh Cider on the Hatherleigh Road.

Local businesses and organisations include a health centre (a branch of the Wallingbrook Surgery in Chulmleigh), a convenience store, a post office, a butchers shop, a florists, a cafe, a veterinary practice, two public houses, and Winkleigh sports centre. Winkleigh also has a primary school.

== Berner's Cross ==
Berner's Cross is a crossroads near the village which was bypassed by the main road in the 1940s when Winkleigh Airfield was under construction; the name now refers to the sharp corner and the area adjacent to it.

== Notable residents ==
- William Davy (1743–1826), an English clergyman and author.
- John Eveleigh (1748–1814), an English churchman and academic, Provost of Oriel College, Oxford.
- Gordon Charles Steele (1891–1981), Royal Naval captain, recipient of the Victoria Cross
- Godfrey Bremridge (1895–1941), First World War flying ace
- Ted Hughes (1930–1998), appointed Poet Laureate in 1984, lived locally
