= West Chapple Farm tragedy =

1975 deaths of three siblings at West Chapple Farm, Devon, England

The West Chapple Farm tragedy refer to the deaths of siblings Frances, Robbie, and Alan Luxton on 23 September 1975, at their family farm near Winkleigh, Devon, England. The incident, involving fatal shotgun wounds, drew significant media attention due to its gruesome nature and the reclusive lifestyle of the Luxton family. The event has been explored in literature, documentaries, and local folklore, raising questions about the circumstances of the deaths and the social and economic pressures faced by the family.

== Background ==
The Luxton family had farmed West Chapple, a 200-acre property, for approximately 600 years, with records tracing their landownership in Devon to the 14th century. By the 19th century, the family owned numerous farms, but economic challenges, including competition from imported food, led to financial decline. Lawrence Luxton, managing West Chapple in the late 1800s, adopted a frugal, traditional approach, avoiding debt and modern farming methods. This philosophy was passed to his son, Robert John, and his grandchildren, Frances, Robbie, and Alan, who continued operating the farm after their father's death in 1939 using outdated techniques, such as scythes and pitchforks.

The Luxtons were known for their insular and thrifty lifestyle. Frances (67) managed household affairs, Robbie (64) oversaw farm operations, and Alan (54) struggled with mental health issues, rarely leaving the property. In 1975, financial difficulties prompted Robbie to agree to sell the farm for £80,000, a decision that caused friction, particularly with Alan, who opposed the sale. The dismissal of long-time farmworker Fred Lyne, who was offered minimal compensation after 22 years, added to local tensions.

== The incident ==
On 23 September 1975, Jim Reynolds, a butcher’s roundsman, discovered the bodies of Frances, Robbie, and Alan Luxton while making a delivery. Frances and Robbie were found in the cider orchard with fatal shotgun wounds, Frances with her head partially destroyed and Robbie with head injuries and stab wounds. Alan was located near the farmhouse, also killed by a shotgun blast. An old French shotgun, typically kept above the kitchen mantelpiece, was found at the scene, along with a cleft stick used to pull the trigger. The house was locked from the inside, with only an upper-floor window open.

The police investigation concluded that no external suspects were involved. The coroner’s inquest in November 1975, held in Okehampton, determined that Alan committed suicide, and Robbie killed Frances before taking his own life. However, the verdict left ambiguities, particularly regarding whether Frances’s death was consensual, and discrepancies, such as a clean knife in Robbie’s pocket despite his stab wounds, were not fully resolved. The rushed inquest, lasting 15 minutes, fueled ongoing speculation.

== Investigation and theories ==
The investigation noted the Luxtons’ reclusive nature and internal family tensions. Alan’s mental health struggles, exacerbated by a broken engagement in the 1950s, and his opposition to the farm’s sale were seen as potential motives. Reports of a prior altercation involving Alan wielding the shotgun against Robbie suggested escalating conflicts. The inquest’s theory posited that Alan shot himself first, prompting Robbie and Frances to find him, after which Robbie killed Frances and himself. However, a 2004 documentary featuring criminologist Tony Colombo and former constable Simon Dell questioned this, suggesting Robbie may have killed both siblings before committing suicide, citing the similarity of Alan’s and Frances’s injuries.

In a 2025 revised edition of Earth to Earth, author John Cornwell introduced a new detail from the inquest: Frances had a broken leg, not noted in the postmortem report but allegedly mentioned by the pathologist. Cornwell proposed an alternative theory: Alan, enraged by the farm’s sale, confronted Frances, who attempted to escape through a window, breaking her leg. Alan shot her, and Robbie, regaining consciousness after an altercation, killed Alan before returning to Frances and taking his own life. This theory remains speculative, as the case’s facts resist a definitive explanation.

== Media and cultural impact ==
The murders attracted extensive media coverage, with newspapers sensationalizing the Luxtons’ reclusive lifestyle and the crime’s grisly details. The incident inspired Earth to Earth (1982) by John Cornwell, which won the Gold Dagger award for its exploration of the Luxton family and the socio-economic factors behind the tragedy. Cornwell’s interpretation of the case drew sharp criticism. Some residents objected to his use of unnamed interviewees and raised concerns that the book emphasised sensational claims, such as a purported incestuous relationship between Frances and Robbie Luxton, without evidence. After its publication 13 people interviewed in the book sent a letter to the Times Literary Supplement complaining of numerous inaccuracies in Earth to Earth that caused them personal distress. Cornwell’s book, based on interviews with Winkleigh residents, drew comparisons to Truman Capote’s In Cold Blood but was modeled on A.J.A. Symons’ The Quest for Corvo. A revised 2025 edition added new details and an alternative theory, reflecting Cornwell’s ongoing engagement with the case.

In 2025, Longreads published a feature by investigative journalist Andrew Chamings, who grew up on a farm neighboring the Luxtons. The article, "Madness, Melancholy, or Murder: An Ancient English Farm’s 50-Year-Old Mystery" revisited the case and its lingering impact on the Devon community and examined the 1975 tragedy alongside local folklore and the controversy surrounding Cornwell’s Earth to Earth. The event is the subject of The Fold, an upcoming film by Oliver Balaam, a distant Luxton relative. In Devon, the murders have entered local folklore, with claims of Frances’s ghost appearing in churchyards, as noted in A Ghostly Almanac of Devon and Cornwall. The story resonates as a commentary on the pressures of traditional farming families amid economic change, with the Luxtons’ resistance to modernization seen as a factor in their tragedy.
