= Darwin's Angel =

2007 book by John Cornwell

Darwin's Angel: An Angelic Riposte to The God Delusion
- Author: John Cornwell
- Language: English
- Subject: Richard Dawkins, The God Delusion, christianity and atheism, apologetics
- Publisher: Profile Books
- Publication date: 2007
- Publication place: United Kingdom
- Media type: Print
- Pages: 168
- ISBN: 978-1-84668-048-9
- OCLC: 677050152
- Dewey Decimal: 211.8 22
- LC Class: BL2775.3 .C67 2007

Darwin's Angel is a book published in response to Richard Dawkins' The God Delusion. It was written by John Cornwell and subtitled An Angelic Riposte to The God Delusion.

Cornwell runs a "Public Understanding of Science" programme at Jesus College, Cambridge, one of the constituent colleges of the University of Cambridge. He has previously written reviews of religious and scientific books, including other works of Dawkins. He stated that he finds The God Delusion harmful in its failure to tackle the problem of extremism, and wrong on many important issues.

== Summary ==
In this book, Cornwell adopts the persona of the guardian angel of Charles Darwin and Gregor Mendel, who is now looking after Richard Dawkins. He pens a letter to Dawkins in 21 chapters.

1. A Summary of your Argument suggests that Dawkins regards all claims about God's existence as "the exclusive province of science and reason".
2. Your Sources suggests that the book ignores distinguished scholarship and uses inappropriate sources.
3. Imagination suggests that Dawkins takes things too literally.
4. Beauty suggests that Dawkins misunderstands the links between beauty, creativity and faith, and suggests he study George Steiner, William Blake, T. S. Eliot and C. S. Lewis.
5. What is Religion suggests that religion is not science and that Dawkins should study sociologists of religion such as Émile Durkheim.
6. Is God Supernatural? claims that Dawkins' image of God is not what most theists believe in.
7. Celestial Teapots suggests that the comparison with Russell's teapot is misplaced because Cornwell claims there are prima facie, albeit inconclusive, grounds for believing in God.
8. God's Simplicity claims that Dawkins imagines that God is an object but this is not how theologians think about God.
9. Theories of Everything claims that Stephen Hawking and others now believe a "Theory of Everything" is impossible due to Gödel's incompleteness theorems.
10. Dawkins versus Dostoyevsky suggests that Dawkins mistakenly attributes the nihilistic views of Ivan Karamazov to Dostoyevsky.
11. Jesus, the Jews and the "Pigs" suggests that Dawkins relies on a single source when he discusses "the moral consideration for others" in Judaism and Christianity being originally intended to apply only to a narrowly defined in-group.
12. Dawkins's Utopia claims that Lenin, Stalin, Mao and Hitler all used "science as an ideology combined with militant atheism". He also claims that Stalin's atheism was foundational to his entire ideology, and that as atheism doesn't necessarily lead to violence, nor does religion.
13. Fundamentalism suggests that it is important to distinguish between tolerant and violent forms of faith. Cornwell also claims it is a category error to confuse creationism and the "doctrine of creation".
14. Is Religious Education Child Abuse? questions whether being indoctrinated in a faith is tantamount to child abuse. He goes on to claim the Amish are a living testimony to the advantages of frugality and simplicity.
15. Life After Death suggests that most religious believers hope for an afterlife.
16. Religious People Less Clever than Atheists? suggests that scientific eminence does not guarantee sound judgement, and that scientists are prejudiced against religious believers.
17. Does our Moral Sense have a Darwinian Origin? claims that there is more to morality than evolution can explain.
18. The Darwinian Imperative claims that attempts to explain religion via evolution are simplistic.
19. Religion as a Bacillus discusses Dr Gerhard Wagner, and states that describing all religious believers as infected with a virus has deplorable overtones.
20. Does God Exist? suggests that Dawkins does not understand the question "why is there something rather than nothing?", which is why he finds it ridiculous. Cornwell goes on to say "the ludicrous anthropomorphic deity that rightly appals" Dawkins is not the view of God most Christian theologians hold.
21. Being Religious suggests that being religious is not a question of factual beliefs but a personal relationship and quest based on prayer and love.

== Reviews and comments ==
The book was praised by Salley Vickers in The Times, Madeleine Bunting in The Guardian, John Polkinghorne in The Times Literary Supplement and Peter Stanford in The Independent and was named one of the 'Books of the Year' by the Financial Times.

Anthony Kenny reviewed the book in The Tablet noting that both Cornwell and Dawkins fail to observe the prime rule of intellectual debate, that one should attack the opponent's arguments, not his personality. Kenny goes on to say that neither The God Delusion nor Darwin's Angel "provides the reader with sufficient grounds for a reasoned conclusion" about God's existence. A profile of Darwin's Angel in New Scientist by Amanda Gefter criticised Cornwell for confusing two meanings of "religion" demarcated in The God Delusion and for holding one religion in higher esteem than any other. She also suggested that both books are part of a modern debate that is suffering from the fact that the two sides do not concentrate on one definition of religion.

Darwin's Angel is listed on the RichardDawkins.net website as one of several "fleas" following The God Delusion.

According to Dawkins, the book contains a number of inaccurate portrayals of what he actually said. Dawkins questions whether these are "honest mistakes or willful mendacity". He suggests six examples where his writing has been quoted out of context or otherwise misrepresented. For example, Cornwell suggests that Dawkins would have been in favour of Social Darwinism when in A Devil's Chaplain Dawkins has explicitly condemned such views and says no one supports such ideas any more.
