= John Eveleigh (Oriel) =

English churchman and academic

John Eveleigh (1748–1814) was an English churchman and academic, Provost of Oriel College, Oxford, from 1781.

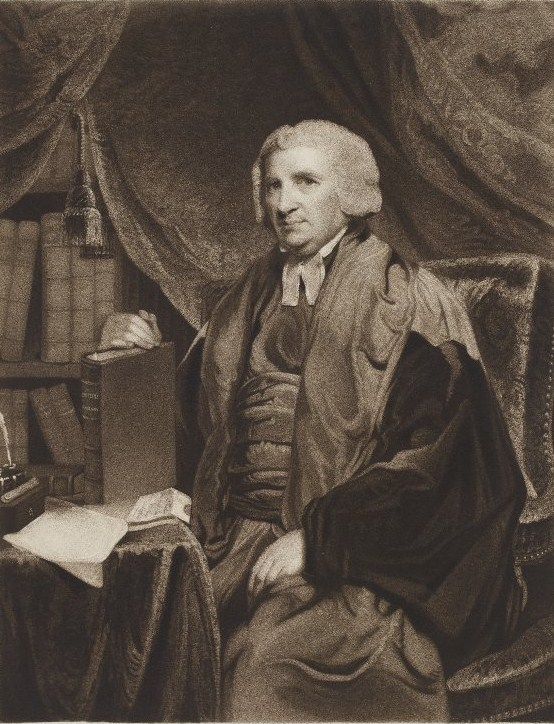
John Eveleigh, 1809 engraving by William Say after John Hoppner

== Life ==
The son of John Eveleigh (1716?–1770), rector of Winkleigh in Devon, by his wife Martha, daughter of John Scobell of Nutcombe. He was born on 22 February 1748, and educated at Blundell's School, Tiverton, and at Wadham College, Oxford, where he matriculated on 15 May 1766, and was an exhibitioner of the college. He was also admitted scholar on 25 September 1767, and graduated B.A. on 19 January 1770. He was elected Fellow of Oriel on 30 March following, and graduated M.A. on 25 November 1772, B.D. on 17 November 1782, and D.D. on 7 May 1783.

Eveleigh was junior treasurer of Oriel in 1772, senior treasurer in 1773, and dean from 1775 to 1781. From 1778 to 1781 he was also vicar of the University Church of St Mary the Virgin, Oxford, and from 1782 to 1792 vicar of Aylesford. On 5 December 1781 he was elected Provost of Oriel in succession to John Clarke, becoming at the same time prebendary of Rochester Cathedral.

As Provost of Oriel Eveleigh raised the college's academic reputation; among the Fellows elected was John Keble. He was also a university reformer, and one of the proponents of the system of classes and honours established in 1800. He died at Oxford on 10 December 1814, was buried in St. Mary's, Oxford, and was succeeded by Edward Copleston.

== Works ==
Eveleigh was Bampton lecturer in 1792, and published his lectures as Eight Sermons in the same year; a second edition with four additional sermons also appeared in 1792, and a third edition in two volumes in 1815. He brought out a work on The Doctrine of the Holy Trinity, Oxford, 1791, and other sermons in 1797 and 1806.

== Family ==
Eveleigh married Dorothy, daughter of William Sandford, Fellow of All Souls College and rector of Hatherop, Gloucestershire, and left an only daughter, Jane, who married John Heathcote Wyndham, rector of Gorton.
