= Hitler's Pope =

1999 book by John Cornwell

- First edition
- Author: John Cornwell
- Subject: Religion
- Publisher: Viking
- Publication date: 1999
- ISBN: 0-670-87620-8

Hitler's Pope is a book published in 1999 by the British journalist and author John Cornwell that examines the actions of Eugenio Pacelli, who became Pope Pius XII, before and during the Nazi era, and explores the charge that he assisted in the legitimization of Adolf Hitler's Nazi regime in Germany, through the pursuit of a Reichskonkordat in 1933. The book is critical of Pius' conduct during the Second World War, arguing that he did not do enough, or speak out enough, against the Holocaust. Cornwell argues that Pius's entire career as the nuncio to Germany, Cardinal Secretary of State, and Pope, was characterized by a desire to increase and centralize the power of the Papacy, and that he subordinated opposition to the Nazis to that goal. He further argues that Pius was antisemitic and that this stance prevented him from caring about the European Jews.

Multiple academics and historians have criticised the book's leading conclusions, and challenged factual assertions contained within it. (Note: Attributed to multiple sources:) Holocaust historian Martin Gilbert credits Pius XII with various actions which saved Jews, and notes that the Nazi security forces referred to him as the "mouthpiece of the Jewish war criminals". Pius XII maintained links to the German Resistance. (Note: Attributed to multiple sources:) According to historian David Kertzer, recently revealed documents show that he was "neither the antisemitic monster often called 'Hitler's Pope' nor a hero".

The author has been praised for attempting to bring into the open the debate on the Catholic Church's relationship with the Nazis, but also accused of making unsubstantiated claims and ignoring positive evidence. The author has moderated some of his allegations since publication of the book. In 2004, Cornwell stated that Pius XII "had so little scope of action that it is impossible to judge the motives for his silence during the war, while Rome was under the heel of Mussolini and later occupied by Germany...But even if his prevarications and silences were performed with the best of intentions, he had an obligation in the postwar period to explain those actions". He similarly stated in 2008 that Pius XII's "scope for action was severely limited", but that "[n]evertheless, due to his ineffectual and diplomatic language in respect of the Nazis and the Jews, I still believe that it was incumbent on him to explain his failure to speak out after the war. This he never did." In 2009, he described Pacelli as effectively a "fellow traveller" of the Nazis.

== Cornwell's work ==
Cornwell's work was the first to have access to testimonies from Pius's beatification process as well as to many documents from Eugenio Pacelli's nunciature which had just been opened under the seventy-five year rule by the Vatican State Secretary archives. Cornwell's work has received both praise and criticism. Eamon Duffy wrote that Cornwell's "gripping and impassioned account" had presented "an indictment that [could not] be ignored" and Saul Friedländer that Cornwell had demonstrated how "Pius XII brought the authoritarianism and the centralization of his predecessors to their most extreme stage." Susan Zuccotti's Under His Very Windows: The Vatican and the Holocaust in Italy (2000) and Michael Phayer's The Catholic Church and the Holocaust, 1930–1965 (2000) are critical of both Cornwell and Pius XII. Ronald J. Rychlak's Hitler, the War and the Pope is critical as well but defends Pius XII in light of his own access to recent documents.

Cornwell researched the conduct of Pacelli, both while he served as nuncio to Germany and after he was made Pope; some of Cornwell's principal resources were the Vatican archives. Cornwell stated that he reassured the archivists he was on the side of the pope as God's representative on earth and, acting in good faith, he had "generous access to unseen material". He concluded that:

Near the end of my research I found myself in a state I can only describe as moral shock. The material I had gathered, taking the more extensive view of Pacelli's life, amounted not to an exoneration but to a wider indictment. Spanning Pacelli's career from the beginning of the century, my research told the story of a bid for unprecedented papal power that by 1933 had drawn the Catholic Church into complicity with the darkest forces of the era. I found evidence, moreover, that from an early stage in his career Pacelli betrayed an undeniable antipathy toward the Jews, and that his diplomacy in Germany in the 1930s had resulted in the betrayal of Catholic political associations that might have challenged Hitler's regime and thwarted the Final Solution. Eugenio Pacelli was no monster; his case is far more complex, more tragic, than that. The interest of his story depends on a fatal combination of high spiritual aspirations in conflict with soaring ambition for power and control. His is not a portrait of evil but of fatal moral dislocation – a separation of authority from Christian love. The consequences of that rupture were collusion with tyranny and, ultimately, violence.

== Allegations of antisemitism ==
Cornwell alleged that, from at least his early '40s onward, Pacelli had antisemitic tendencies. He traced the earliest manifestation of these antisemitic tendencies to an incident in 1917 in which Pacelli refused to help facilitate the exportation of palm fronds from Italy to be used by German Jews in Munich to celebrate the festival of Tabernacles. Cornwell argued that, although this incident was "small in itself", it "belies subsequent claims that Pacelli had a great love of the Jewish religion and was always motivated by its best interests."

Cornwell stated he uncovered a "time bomb" letter signed and personally annotated by Pacelli that had been lying in the Vatican archives since 1919, regarding the actions of communist revolutionaries in Munich. Regarding this letter, Cornwell stated: "The repeated references to the Jewishness of these individuals, amid the catalogue of epithets describing their physical and moral repulsiveness, gives an impression of stereotypical anti-Semitic contempt". Cornwell asserts that the letter from Pacelli to Pietro Gaspam [sic Gasparri] portrays Jews in an unfavorable light and associates them with the Bolshevik revolution.

In the assessment of Frank J. Coppa, writing for Encyclopædia Britannica, Cornwell's depiction of Pacelli as antisemitic lacks "credible substantiation". Coppa writes: "though Pius's wartime public condemnations of racism and genocide were cloaked in generalities, he did not turn a blind eye to the suffering but chose to use diplomacy to aid the persecuted. It is impossible to know if a more forthright condemnation of the Holocaust would have proved more effective in saving lives, though it probably would have better assured his reputation."

== Papal absolutism ==
Cornwell asserts that Pacelli was a strong proponent of the absolute leadership principle. He writes that, "More than any other Vatican official of the century, [Pacelli] promoted the modern ideology of autocratic papal control, the highly centralized, dictatorial authority."

== Allegations of collaboration with fascist leaders ==
Cornwell argued that Pacelli's antisemitism, combined with his drive to promote papal absolutism, inexorably led him to collaboration with fascist leaders, a collaboration which led to what Cornwell characterizes as "the betrayal of Catholic democratic politics in Germany".

Cornwell describes this collaboration with fascist leaders as starting in 1929 with the concordat with Mussolini known as the Lateran Treaty, and followed by the concordat with Hitler known as the Reichskonkordat.

=== Lateran Treaty ===
Cornwell recounts that Eugenio Pacelli's brother, Francesco, successfully negotiated a concordat with Mussolini as part of an agreement known as the Lateran Treaty. A precondition of the negotiations had involved the dissolution of the parliamentary Catholic Italian Popular Party. Cornwell claims that Pius XI disliked political Catholicism because it was beyond his control. According to Cornwell, a succession of Popes took the view that Catholic party politics "brought democracy into the church by the back door". Cornwell asserts that the result of the demise of the Popular Party was the "wholesale shift of Catholics into the Fascist Party and the collapse of democracy in Italy".

=== Anti-communist posture of the Vatican ===
Cornwell asserts that Pius XI and his new secretary of state, Eugenio Pacelli, were determined that at a time that saw the church persecuted by Communist and socialist regimes from the Soviet Union to Mexico and later Spain, no accommodation was to be reached with Communists. At the same time, Cornwell alleges that Pius XI and Pacelli were more open to collaboration with totalitarian movements and regimes of the right.

=== Reichskonkordat ===
Cornwell asserts that Hitler was determined to conclude a concordat with the Vatican similar to the one that Mussolini had negotiated. According to Cornwell, Hitler was obsessed by a fear of German Catholics who, politically united by the Center Party, had defeated Otto von Bismarck's Kulturkampf, during the "culture struggle" against the Catholic Church in the 1870s. According to Cornwell, Hitler was "convinced that his movement could succeed only if political Catholicism and its democratic networks were eliminated".

== Criticism of Cornwell's work ==
A major response to Hitler's Pope came from University of Mississippi law professor Ronald J. Rychlak in his 2000 book on the subject, Hitler, the War, and the Pope. Rychlak was acknowledged by the Vatican to have been given special access to their closed archives for his research.

Rychlak disagreed with Cornwell's claim of having found a "time bomb letter", arguing that the letter in question had actually been written not by Pacelli but by his assistant, and moreover had been fully published and discussed in a 1992 book by Emma Fattorini (a highly respected docent at the University of Rome). With respect to Cornwell's allegations of antisemitism, Rychlak stated that "When Pius XII died in 1958, there were tributes from virtually every Jewish group around the world".

Rychlak also alleged that Cornwell manipulated the photograph on the front cover of the American edition of the book, and incorrectly dated the photo as having been taken in March 1939, the month that Pacelli was made Pope. Rychlak charged that this had been done deliberately in order to give the impression that Pius had just visited Hitler when, in fact, the photo had been taken in 1927 as Pius was leaving a reception held for German President Paul von Hindenburg. Robert Royal has also repeated this allegation.

In his 2005 book The Myth of Hitler's Pope, the historian and rabbi David G. Dalin also countered Cornwell. Dalin suggested that Yad Vashem should honor Pope Pius XII as a "Righteous Gentile," concluding that "[t]he anti-papal polemics of ex-seminarians like Garry Wills and John Cornwell ... of ex-priests like James Carroll, and or other lapsed or angry liberal Catholics exploit the tragedy of the Jewish people during the Holocaust to foster their own political agenda of forcing changes on the Catholic Church today." Dalin called the book's conclusions "unverified" and "strongly anti-religious". Eugene Fisher, who has a PhD in Hebrew culture and education, said it was a "sad commentary on the secular media that this anti-Catholic screed was ever published".

In his book The New Anti-Catholicism: The Last Acceptable Prejudice, Philip Jenkins said that Hitler's Pope could not be understood except as a series of "very low blows against the modern Catholic Church, and specifically the papacy of John Paul II."

Ken Woodward, writing in Newsweek, stated that Hitler's Pope has "errors of fact and ignorance of context [that] appear on almost every page."

In an historical assessment of Pope Pius XII, the Encyclopædia Britannica addressed Cornwell's book in the following terms: "John Cornwell's controversial book on Pius, Hitler's Pope (1999), characterized him as antisemitic. [The depiction], however, lack[s] credible substantiation". The Encyclopedia further assessed his role in aiding Jews during the Holocaust as follows: "Although he allowed the national hierarchies to assess and respond to the situation in their countries, he established the Vatican Information Service to provide aid to, and information about, thousands of war refugees and instructed the church to provide discreet aid to Jews, which quietly saved thousands of lives".

The 2013 book Disinformation: Former Spy Chief Reveals Secret Strategies for Undermining Freedom, Attacking Religion, and Promoting Terrorism by Rychlak and Pacepa criticises Cornwell and suggests the basis for many allegations were leaks from the Soviets as an attempt to undermine Catholic influence and thus weaken it as an anti-Communist enemy.

== Cornwell's later views ==
According to a 2004 article in The Economist, Cornwell's historical work has not always been "fair-minded" and Hitler's Pope specifically "lacked balance". The article goes on to state that Cornwell, "chastened", had admitted as much himself, in a later work, The Pontiff in Winter, citing the following quote as evidence:

I would now argue, in the light of the debates and evidence following 'Hitler's Pope', that Pius XII had so little scope of action that it is impossible to judge the motives for his silence during the war, while Rome was under the heel of Mussolini and later occupied by the Germans. [...] But even if his prevarications and silences were performed with the best of intentions, he had an obligation in the postwar period to explain those actions.

In a 2008 interview, Cornwell stated:

While I believe with many commentators that the pope might have done more to help the plight of the Jews, I now feel, 10 years after the publication of my book, that his scope for action was severely limited and I am prepared to state this. [...] Nevertheless, due to his ineffectual and diplomatic language in respect of the Nazis and the Jews, I still believe that it was incumbent on him to explain his failure to speak out after the war. This he never did.

In 2009 he described Cardinal Pacelli (the future Pope Pius XII) as being an example of a "fellow traveller" of the Nazis who was willing to accept the generosity of Hitler in the educational sphere (more schools, teachers and pupil places), so long as the Church withdrew from the social and political sphere, at the same time as Jews were being dismissed from universities and Jewish pupil places were being reduced. For this he considers Pacelli as effectively being in collusion with the Nazi cause, if not by intent. He further argues that Monsignor Kaas, who was involved in negotiations for the Reichskonkordat, and at that time the head of the Roman Catholic Centre Party, persuaded his party members, with the acquiescence of Pacelli, in the summer of 1933 to enable Hitler to acquire dictatorial powers. He argues that the Catholic Centre Party vote was decisive in the adoption of dictatorial powers by Hitler and that the party's subsequent dissolution was at Pacelli's prompting.

== See also ==
- The Myth of Hitler's Pope
- Pius XII and the German Resistance
