= Bettina L. Love =

African-American educator

- Education: University of Pittsburgh (BS); University of Pittsburgh (MEd); Georgia State University (PhD)
- Occupations: professor, author, educator
- Website: bettinalove.com/bio/

Bettina L. Love is an American author and academic. She is the William F. Russell Professor at Teachers College, Columbia University. She pioneered the concept of abolitionist teaching. According to Love, abolitionist teaching refers to restoring humanity for students. Love also advocates for eliminating standardized tests.

== Early life and education ==
Love was born in Rochester, New York. Love graduated with a bachelor's degree in Liberal Studies from the University of Pittsburgh in 2001. She obtained her MEd in Elementary Education also from the University of Pittsburgh in 2002. She received her PhD in Educational Policy Studies from Georgia State University in 2008.

== Career ==
Love taught at Northern Kentucky University from 2009 to 2011. From 2011 to 2015, she was assistant professor in the Department of Educational Theory & Practice at the University of Georgia, then became an associate professor of education. In 2021, she was a visiting professor at Columbia University, then joined the faculty as a full professor in 2022.

Love focuses on how educators can build civically engaged schools rooted in abolitionist teaching with equitable classrooms that affirm black and brown children. In April 2017, Love participated in a one-on-one public lecture with bell hooks focused on liberatory education. In 2018, the Georgia House of Representatives presented Love with a resolution for her impact on the field of education. Also in 2018, she was scholar-in-residence at the University of Houston–Downtown's Center for Critical Race Studies. She was named as part of the Georgia State University Alumni Association's inaugural 40 under 40 distinguished alumni class.

In 2014, she was invited to the White House Research Conference on Girls to discuss her work focused on the lives of black girls. For her work in the field of hip-hop education, in 2015, Love was named the Nasir Jones Hiphop Fellow at the Hutchins Center for African and African American Research at Harvard University. She has also provided commentary for various news outlets including NPR, Education Week, The Guardian, and The Atlanta Journal Constitution. In 2020, Love was named a member of the Old Fourth Ward Economic Security Task Force of the Atlanta City Council.

She is the author of the books We Want to Do More Than Survive: Abolitionist Teaching and the Pursuit of Educational Freedom and Hip Hop's Li'l Sistas Speak: Negotiating Hip Hop Identities and Politics in the New South. Her book Punished for Dreaming was a New York Times Best Seller. Her work has appeared in numerous books and journals, including English Education, Urban Education, The Urban Review, and the Journal of LGBT Youth.

== Awards and nominations ==
Year	Nominated work	Award	Category	Result	Ref.
2023	Punished for Dreaming: How School Reform Harms Black Children and How We Heal	Los Angeles Times Book Prize	Current Interest	Finalist	
2024	Punished for Dreaming: How School Reform Harms Black Children and How We Heal	Audie Award	Nonfiction	Finalist	
2024	Punished for Dreaming: How School Reform Harms Black Children and How We Heal	Goddard Riverside Book Prizes for Social Justice	Stephan Russo Book Prize for Social Justice	Finalist	
2024	Punished for Dreaming: How School Reform Harms Black Children and How We Heal	Brooklyn Public Library Book Prize	Nonfiction	Longlist	
2024	Punished for Dreaming: How School Reform Harms Black Children and How We Heal	Stowe Prize for Literary Activism	—	Winner	
2024	—	Better Brothers Los Angeles/Diva Foundation Truth Award	Excellence in Education	Winner	

== Selected works ==
=== Books ===
- Hip Hop's Li'l Sistas Speak: Negotiating Hip Hop Identities and Politics in the New South. (Peter Lang, 2012).
- We Want To Do More Than Survive: Abolitionist Teaching and the Pursuit of Educational Freedom. (Beacon Press, 2019).
- Punished for Dreaming: How School Reform Harms Black Children and How We Heal. (St. Martin's Press, 2023).

=== Articles ===
- "'I See Trayvon Martin': What Teachers Can Learn from the Tragic Death of a Young Black Male." The Urban Review, vol. 46, no. 2, 2013.
- "Urban Storytelling: How Storyboarding, Moviemaking, and Hip-Hop-Based Education Can Promote Students' Critical Voice." The English Journal, vol. 103, no. 5, May 2014.
- "A Ratchet Lens: Black Queer Youth, Agency, Hip Hop, and the Black Ratchet Imagination." Educational Researcher, vol. 46, no. 9, December 2017.
- "Dear White Teachers: You Can't Love Your Black Students If You Don't Know Them." Education Week, March 2019.
