= Florence Williams =

Journalist and author

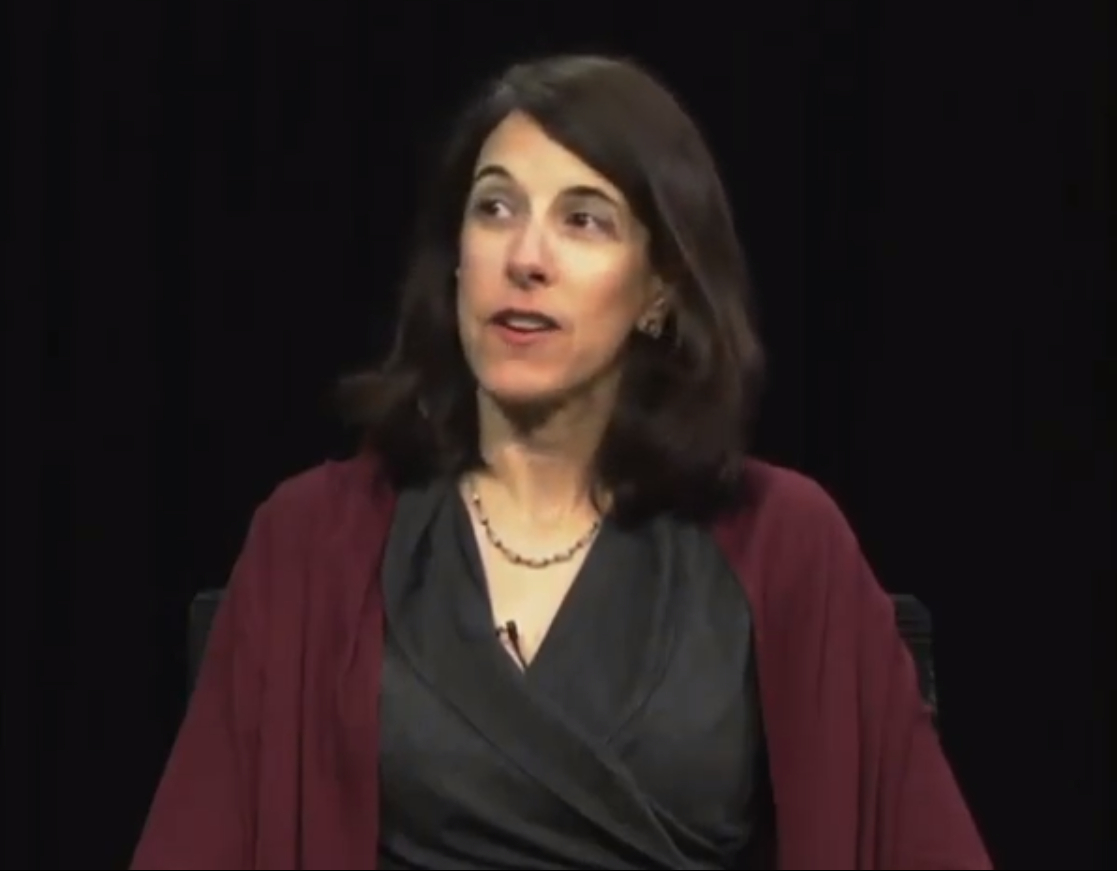
Williams in 2017

Florence Williams is an American journalist and nonfiction author whose work focuses on the environment, health and science. She is a contributing editor at Outside magazine and a freelance writer for National Geographic, the New York Times, New York Times Magazine, The New York Review of Books, Slate, Mother Jones, High Country News, O-Oprah, W., Bicycling and numerous other publications.

"Human milk is like ice cream, penicillin, and the drug ecstasy all wrapped up in two pretty packages." — Florence Williams

Her first book, Breasts: A Natural and Unnatural History, received the Los Angeles Times Book Prize in science and technology and the 2013 Audie in general nonfiction. The New York Times named it a notable book of 2012.

Her second book, The Nature Fix, which investigates connections between the brain and nature, was released in February 2017. Edward O. Wilson called the book, "A beautifully written, thoroughly enjoyable exposition of a major principle of human life now supported by evidence in biology, psychology, and medicine."

Her third book, Heartbreak, which deals with her personal stress from divorce and the science underlying such stress, was released in February 2022. In the book Williams reports on her own suffering and recounts her investigations of emotional heartbreak – including her experiences at "conferences, wilderness programs for sex-trafficked women, universities, medical specialists, countless studies, an epic paddle down the Green River and even a Museum of Broken Relationships in Zagreb, Croatia."

She was a Scripps Fellow at the Center of Environmental Journalism at the University of Colorado. She is a fellow at the Center for Humans and Nature and a visiting scholar at George Washington University. She serves on the board of nonprofit environmental magazine, High Country News.

She has received many awards, including six magazine awards from the American Society of Journalists and Authors and the John Hersey Prize at Yale. Her work has been anthologized in numerous books, including Outside 25 (2002), The New Montana Story (2003), How the West Was Warmed (2009) and Best American Science and Nature Writing (2008). She was named "Author of the week" by The Week in May 2012. The Wall Street Journal calls her writing "droll and crisp."

Williams is the writer and host of two Gracie-Award-winning Audible Original series, Breasts Unbound and The Three-Day Effect, produced by Mary Beth Kirchner for Audible Originals. She was nominated for a 2022 Webby for a podcast episode written for Meditative Stories. In addition, she has made two appearances on Fresh Air with Terry Gross.

She lives in Washington, D.C.
