= Jeremy Siepmann =

American-British broadcaster and writer (1942 – 2016)

Jeremy Siepmann (16 January 1942 – 6 April 2016), born in America and living in Britain for most of his career, was a broadcaster and writer on music.

== Life ==
Siepmann was born in Boston, Massachusetts, USA, in 1942. His father Charles, born in Britain, was a former BBC executive; his mother Dolly was American. He was educated at The Putney School in Vermont, and at the Mannes School of Music.

In 1963 he began a radio broadcasting career: In New York he made a series about the life of Mozart; there followed a weekly satirical programme for the BBC Home Service about life in America.

He moved to Britain, taking the advice of Malcolm Sargent. He was a freelance lecturer, and from 1973, advertising for "seriously interested pupils", he taught the piano to students of all levels. He broadcasting career resumed in 1977, and presented many programmes, including Music and the Movies and The Elements of Music; in 1988 he became head of music at the BBC World Service. In 1992 he left the BBC and formed his own production company. In 1997 he became editor of Piano magazine.

Siepmann contributed articles and reviews to several magazine including Gramophone, The Musical Times and BBC Music Magazine, particularly writing about pianists and music for the piano. He wrote many books about music.

He married Johanna Renouf, and they had two sons. The marriage was dissolved, and in 1980 he married Deborah Overbeck; they had two sons.

== Works ==
Publications include

- Chopin: The Reluctant Romantic (1995)
- The Piano (1996)
- Brahms (1997)
- Mozart: His Life and Music (2006)
- The Life and Works of Beethoven (Audio, 2001)
