= Michael Paterniti =

American writer

Michael Paterniti is an American writer known for magazine articles in publications such as Harper's, the New Yorker, GQ, and Esquire, as well as his book The Telling Room (2013).

Paterniti lives in Portland, Maine and was born in Darien, Connecticut. After his graduation from the University of Michigan, Paterniti pursued a career as an editor and magazine writer.

Paterniti is the author of "Driving Mr. Albert: A Trip Across America with Einstein's Brain", his account of a cross-country car trip with the pathologist who performed Albert Einstein’s autopsy and Einstein’s brain itself. The book is based on a Harper's essay that won the 1998 National Magazine award.

In 2015, he published a collection of his best magazine stories, Love And Other Ways Of Dying: Essays. It was longlisted for the National Book Awards in that year.
