= The Joy of Sweat =

2021 book by Sarah Everts

- Author: Sarah Everts
- Genre: Science
- Publisher: W. W. Norton & Company
- Publication date: 2021
- ISBN: 978-0-393-63567-6

The Joy of Sweat: The Strange Science of Perspiration is a popular science book by Sarah Everts, published in 2021 by W. W. Norton & Company. Featured in The New York Times, The Wall Street Journal, and Science Friday, this 11-chapter monograph describes how sweat is made, the significant benefits perspiration provides for human performance, and the absurdities behind its societal stigmatization.
