= The Crisis of Zionism =

2012 book by Peter Beinart

- First edition
- Author: Peter Beinart
- Language: English
- Subject: Israel, Palestine, Zionism
- Publisher: Melbourne University Publishing
- Publication date: 2012
- Publication place: United States
- Media type: Print (Paperback)
- Pages: 289
- ISBN: 9780522861761

The Crisis of Zionism is a 2012 book by Peter Beinart. The book describes Beinart's views about the Israeli–Palestinian conflict. Particularly, Beinart contends that policies advocated by Zionists especially under Benjamin Netanyahu's Likud government are increasingly at odds with liberal ideals. He points to Israeli settlements in the West Bank as one troubling aspect of this policy.

The book originated with a piece published in The New York Review of Books in 2010 entitled "The Failure of the American Jewish Establishment".

The book has been received unfavorably by many pro-Israeli groups. This criticism increased when Beinart called for a boycott of West Bank settlements.

A favorable item published by New York Times columnist Paul Krugman on his now-defunct blog referred to Beinart as having written a “brave book.” (Note: Something I’ve been meaning to do — and still don’t have the time to do properly — is say something about Peter Beinart’s brave book The Crisis of Zionism. The truth is that like many liberal American Jews — and most American Jews are still liberal — I basically avoid thinking about where Israel is going. It seems obvious from here that the narrow-minded policies of the current government are basically a gradual, long-run form of national suicide — and that’s bad for Jews everywhere, not to mention the world. But I have other battles to fight, and to say anything to that effect is to bring yourself under intense attack from organized groups that try to make any criticism of Israeli policies tantamount to anti-Semitism. But it’s only right to say something on behalf of Beinart, who has predictably run into that buzzsaw. As I said, a brave man, and he deserves better.)
