= Yossef Bodansky =

Israeli-American defense analyst

- Born: May 1, 1954; Israel
- Died: December 5, 2021 (aged 67); Maryland, United States
- Occupations: Director of the Congressional Task Force on Terrorism and Unconventional Warfare (1988–2004), Director of Research of the International Strategic Studies Association, Senior Editor for the Defense and Foreign Affairs

Yossef Bodansky (May 1, 1954 – December 5, 2021) was an Israeli-American political scientist who served as Director of the Congressional Task Force on Terrorism and Unconventional Warfare of the US House of Representatives from 1988 to 2004. He was also Director of Research of the International Strategic Studies Association and has been a visiting scholar at Johns Hopkins University's Paul H. Nitze School of Advanced International Studies (SAIS). In the 1980s, he served as a senior consultant for the Department of Defense and the Department of State.

Bodansky was a senior editor for the Defense and Foreign Affairs group of publications and a contributor to the International Military and Defense Encyclopedia and was on the Advisory Council of The Intelligence Summit. Bodansky's numerous articles have been published in Global Affairs, Jane's Defence Weekly, Defense and Foreign Affairs: Strategic Policy and other periodicals.

Bodansky was a Director of Global Panel America (Global Panel Foundation), and a director of the related Prague Society, a non-governmental organization which grew out of the dissident movement, with the aim of tracking down former members of the Communist-era of Secret Police.

Bodansky died at his home in Baltimore, Maryland on 5 December 2021.

== Congressional Task Force ==
The work of the Congressional Task Force (which had been established in 1981) involved staff producing what they described as "ground truth" by "repeated visits to the areas they were studying and [developing] face-to-face relationships with their sources" and actively participated in supporting them. According to a compilation of Task Force reports published in 2007, "Task Force staff members went into Afghanistan and rode with the mujahideen as they fought against the Soviets. They helped the fighters secure the weapons and humanitarian aid they needed and evacuate the seriously wounded." The Task Force also contributed to related legislation, including authoring "key parts of the Diplomatic Security and Anti-Terrorism Act" (1986), allowing the FBI to investigate outside the US. Task Force reports did not generally divulge sourcing in public reports, and fully referenced versions of their reports were released only to the Task Force chairmen, and not even to other committee members.

== Criticisms of scholarship and Task Force affair ==
Bodansky's scholarship and expertise was seriously questioned on occasions, but most notably during and after the Task Force engagement with Bosnian War and resulting written report.

Also, scholars and authors such as Norman Cigar, Michael Sells, Brad K. Blitz, describe his perspective as anti-Islamic and/or anti-Muslim and extreme.
Gabriele Marranci, an anthropologist working on religion with a specialization in Muslim societies and current Director of the Study of Contemporary Muslim Lives research hub at Macquarie University, identified Bodansky as part of the "anti-Muslim chimera", and that through their work and influence such anti-Muslim perspectives have found a way to the receptive ears of academic and political establishment.

His books lack documentation and footnotes.

=== Task Force report on Bosnia controversy ===
Bodansky used his position as a Director of Task Force on Terrorism and Unconventional Warfare as a springboard for claims, included in task force report, in which he co-wrote, at the time of Bosnian War and Bosnian Genocide perpetrated against Bosnian Muslims, that Bosnian Muslim President Alija Izetbegović and his government were allegedly creating an Islamic republic in Europe as part of an international Islamist conspiracy; that Bosnian Muslim forces were killing their own people and foreigners in an attempt to blame the Serbs and provoke international response against Serb forces, provide an excuse for alleged Muslim atrocities; assertions which lead to controversy over the intentions and scholarship of the report co-authors, namely Task Force Chief of Staff Vaughn S. Forrest and Director Yossef Bodansky himself.
As a result four of the task force's congressional members resigned, namely task force co-chair Dana Rohrabacher(R-CA), representatives James Sensenbrenner, Jr. (R-WI), Olympia Snowe (R-ME) and Christopher Cox (R-CA), with Rohrabacher's legislative assistant for foreign affairs, Peter Behrends, summarizing: "It was the scholarship of the piece that was the problem. It just wasn't credible scholarship. We asked and we were never shown any documentation."
Representative Christopher Cox explained that the purpose of any Republican task forces is to exert "some measure of influence" over Democrat controlled committees in congress, but instead of Republican congressmen influence over their Democratic colleagues, this task force staff attempted to influence Republican congressmen.

=== Bias and Serbian lobby connections ===
Professor of comparative religions at Haverford College and author, Michael Sells, reviewed connections between Bodansky, Task Force on Terrorism and Unconventional Warfare, and the Belgrade lobby groups created at the time, such as Serbian Unity Congress.

Norman Cigar, author, contributor, current Research Fellow at the Marine Corps University, Quantico, VA, recent retiree from position of Director of Regional Studies and the Minerva Research Chair, outlined Bodansky's professional record and advisory engagements with the lawmakers, in his letter to Rep. Jim Saxton as one of principle "hostility to Islam and Muslims everywhere, who are seen to be part of a unified international conspiracy and a threat to everyone else, and he seems to feel that Serb nationalists share that outlook." Like Sells, Cigar also noted that Bodansky was in close relation with Milošević's Serbian lobby group, Serbian Unity Congress, where he was featured speaker at the group's fund raiser event in Detroit in 1996. In this context Bodansky has written on the former Yugoslavia and interpreted subsequent wars as Muslim unified international conspiracy, which Bosnians were allegedly part of, to expand into Europe. Bodansky also hyped a "mujahedin" threat by claiming that "up to 20,000" mujahedin were in Bosnia, overestimating their number by more than 10 to 1, according to US government. Cigar points that Bodansky's views "are extreme and not shared by mainstream anlaysts", regardless of some Senator's staffer, to whom Cigar spoke back in 1996, carried the Bodansky Task Force report around. In an interview with Belgrade based media on 14 May 1998, Bodansky exerted view in which he blamed Arabs, who allegedly exploited Tito's 1960s and 1970s pro-Arab policy, for Yugoslavia and Christian Serbs demise, in which Bosnian Muslims hid their agenda of "long-prepared operation for an Islamic jihad against the Christians" behind the multiethnic facade.

Similarly to both Sells and Cigar, Brad K. Blitz in his article, "Serbia's War Lobby: Diaspora Groups and Western Elites", which has been included in the book, This Time We Knew: Western Responses to Genocide in Bosnia, edited by Thomas Cushman, Professor of Sociology at Wellesley College in Massachusetts and the founder and editor of the Journal of Human Rights and Stjepan G. Meštrović, Professor of Sociology at Texas A & M University, analyzes Serbia's diaspora and lobby groups activities during the war in Bosnia, and its connection to political and intellectual elites in western governments and public. He described London and New Delhi based journal, "Defense and Foreign Affairs Strategic Policy", as repeatedly including "articles that apologized for the Serbian leadership's role in the Balkan conflict". Blitz identifies Yossef Bodansky as journal's most prominent writer and one of its editors, whose articles "reflect a strong anti-Islamic bias" in their discussion of the Balkans.

=== Criticism of Defence & Foreign Affairs ===
On Bodansky's engagement with the London-based Defence & Foreign Affairs, where he published regularly in role of Contributing Editor, Norman Cigar points on outlet's significant pro-Serbian bias, noting how it "routinely carries material that is often indistinguishable from that distributed by official sources in Belgrade".

=== Criticism of Chechen Jihad ===
His published works "Chechen Jihad: Al Qaeda's Training Ground and the Next Wave of Terror" and "The High Cost of Peace: How Washington's Middle East Policy Left America Vulnerable to Terrorism" also do not contain any footnotes and documentation. For this reason it is difficult to separate facts from fiction, rumor and opinion in his works. For example, in Chechen Jihad he states that the November 12th, 2001 crash of American Airlines Flight 587 in New York was caused by a "Canadian terrorist". No authoritative citation for this claim is given.

=== Criticism of Secret History of the Iraq War ===
Steve Gilbert reviewing Bodansky's book Secret History of the Iraq War called it "suspiciously like conspiracy theory", with too "many of his alleged secrets", and as book lacking any footnotes, readers could dismiss it as an "imaginative mixture of fact, rumor, and fiction".

== Publications ==
Books

- Target America: Terrorism in the U.S. (1993, Shapolsky Publishers Inc.).
- Crisis in Korea (1994, Shapolsky Publishers Inc.).
- Terror: The Inside Story of The Terrorist Conspiracy in America (1994, Shapolsky Publishers Inc.).
- Offensive in the Balkans: The Potential for a Wider War as a Result of Foreign Intervention in Bosnia-Herzegovina (1995, International Media Corp./ISSA). (Online version)
- Some Call It Peace: Waiting for War In the Balkans (1996, International Media Corp./ISSA). (Online version)
- Bin Laden: The Man Who Declared War on America (1999, 2001, Random House).
- Islamic Anti-Semitism as a Political Instrument (1999, 2000, ACPR Publications and Tammuz Publishers).
- The High Cost of Peace: How Washington's Middle East Policy Left America Vulnerable to Terrorism (2002, Random House).
- The Secret History of the Iraq War (2004, HarperCollins).
- Chechen Jihad: Al Qaeda's Training Ground and the Next Wave of Terror (2007, HarperCollins).

Articles and commentary

- "Jerusalem in Context," Freeman Center for Strategic Studies Broadcast, June 7, 1995; print copy June 12, 1995 (found archived on internet).
- "The Rise Of The Trans-Asian Axis: Is It The Basis Of New Confrontation?" kimsoft.com, 1997.
- "Expediting the Return of Salah Al-Din," JINSA Online, June 1, 1998.
