= Rosanna Hertz =

Rosanna Hertz is an American academic, educator, and sociologist. She is the chair of Women's and Gender Studies at Wellesley College, where she has taught since 1983 as a professor of Sociology and Women's and Gender Studies. She chaired the Women's and Gender Studies Department from 1999 to 2008 and then again from 2012 to 2016. She was president of the Eastern Sociological Society from 2009 to 2010.

She authored Single by Chance, Mothers by Choice: How Women Are Choosing Parenthood without Marriage and Creating the New American Family (Oxford University Press, 2006, ISBN 978-0195341409) and More Equal Than Others: Women and Men in Dual-Career Marriages (University of California Press, 1986, ISBN 9780520063372), as well as numerous sociological articles.
