= John Cornwell (writer) =

British journalist, author, and academic (born 1940)

John Cornwell FRSL (born 21 May 1940) is a British journalist, author, and academic. Since 1990, he has directed the Science and Human Dimension Project at Jesus College, Cambridge, where he was also, until 2017, Founder and Director of the Rustat Conferences. He is a Fellow of the Royal Society of Literature and was awarded an Honorary Doctorate of Letters (University of Leicester) in 2011. He was nominated for the PEN/Ackerley Prize for best UK memoir 2007 (Seminary Boy) and shortlisted Specialist Journalist of the Year (science, medicine in Sunday Times Magazine), British Press Awards 2006. He won the Scientific and Medical Network Book of the Year Award for Hitler's Scientists, 2005; and received the Independent Television Authority-Tablet Award for contributions to religious journalism (1994). In 1982 he won the Gold Dagger Award Non-Fiction (1982) for Earth to Earth. He is best known for his investigative journalism; memoir; and his work in public understanding of science. In addition to his books on the relationship between science, ethics and the humanities, he has written widely on the Catholic Church and the modern papacy, often with much controversy.

== Early life ==
John Cornwell was born in East Ham, London, the son of Sidney Arthur Cornwell and Kathleen Egan Cornwell. Raised as a Roman Catholic, Cornwell entered the junior seminary, Cotton College, in 1953 intending to become a priest. He later wrote a memoir of his five years at Cotton. He continued to the senior seminary, Oscott College, Sutton Coldfield, in 1958.

Cornwell studied English Language and Literature at St Benet's Hall, Oxford and was tutored by Jonathan Wordsworth at Exeter College. He graduated in 1964, and went on to Christ's College, Cambridge as a graduate student.

After Cambridge, Cornwell taught in East London schools, before becoming a teaching fellow in English and philosophy at McMaster University, Ontario. From 1970 to 1976 he worked as a freelance journalist, mainly for The Guardian and The Observer Magazine, with periods in Italy and Latin America as a Foreign Correspondent. In 1973 he reported from Buenos Aires, and in 1975 from Santiago, Chile, and Buenos Aires. From 1976 to 1988 he was on the staff at The Observer, serving on the Foreign desk and later as Editor and Manager of The Observer Foreign News Service, which he took from hard copy to high speed wire delivery worldwide. In 1982 he was appointed New Media Publisher, responsible for developing seven parallel media businesses, including creation of UK's first interactive electronic newspaper with Prestel, joint venture book publishing, and educational resources. He was The Observer's delegate at the International Press Institute (1978–1988); investigator and rapporteur on the 20th Century Fund Task Force convened in New York and Oxford in 1978–79 on the tensions between Western free-enterprise media and government media organisations: findings and analysis published in his Free and Balanced Flow (1979).

His first two books were novels: The Spoiled Priest, and Seven Other Demons. Two decades later he published a third novel, Strange Gods. In 1973 he published a critical biography of Samuel Taylor Coleridge, Coleridge, Poet and Revolutionary, 1772–1804.

In 1982 he published Earth to Earth, the story of a farming family tragedy at Winkleigh in Devon, for which he won the non-fiction Gold Dagger Award.

== A Thief in the Night ==
His 1989 book A Thief in the Night investigated the 1978 death of Pope John Paul I, which is surrounded by conspiracy theories. Though Cornwell sharply criticised Vatican prelates, he concluded that the Pope was not murdered but died of a pulmonary embolism, possibly brought on by overwork and neglect.

== Hitler's Pope ==
In 1999, Cornwell published Hitler's Pope, in which he accuses Pope Pius XII of assisting in the legitimisation of the Nazi regime in Germany through the pursuit of a Reichskonkordat in 1933 and of remaining silent, like the Allies, after information about The Holocaust was released to the public in late 1942 and early 1943. Owen Chadwick praised the book's scholarly approach and the abundance of new information Cornwell had managed to unearth.

In 2004, Cornwell stated that Pius XII "had so little scope of action that it is impossible to judge the motives for his silence during the war, while Rome was under the heel of Mussolini and later occupied by Germany ... But even if his prevarications and silences were performed with the best of intentions, he had an obligation in the postwar period to explain those actions". He similarly stated in 2008 that Pius XII's "scope for action was severely limited", but that "[n]evertheless, due to his ineffectual and diplomatic language in respect of the Nazis and the Jews, I still believe that it was incumbent on him to explain his failure to speak out after the war. This he never did." It should be pointed out, that Cornwell was compelled to respond to other scholars' critique of his research and assertions, in regard to Pius' actions during the war.

In a variety of broadcasts and subsequent print commentary Cornwell has continued to insist that Pacelli's principal failure (as Cardinal Secretary of State), through the Reichskonkordat (1933), was to act as a fellow traveller, taking benefits from Hitler on behalf of Pius XI and the Catholic Church while patently distancing himself from Nazi ideology – the effect of which was to scandalise youth, demoralise opposition, and give Hitler credit in the eyes of the world.

In 2003, Cornwell followed up Hitler's Pope with Hitler's Scientists.

== A Pontiff in Winter ==
In 2004, Cornwell also published A Pontiff in Winter, a work critical of Pope John Paul II. Reviews of the book were often fiercely divided. James Carroll in The Washington Post said the book "dissects the record of John Paul II's pontificate with an informed, dispassionate and fully convincing authority". Writing in The Guardian, Stephen Bates said: "John Cornwell has produced a devastating report. Catholics should read it, if not to change their views – though perhaps it should – then at least to inform them".

== Newman's Unquiet Grave: The Reluctant Saint ==
Published in 2010 by Continuum, this biography of Cardinal John Henry Newman coincided with renewed interest in the 19th century theologian and religious leader as a result of his beatification during the Papal visit by Pope Benedict XVI to England and Scotland. Philosopher Anthony Kenny in The Times Literary Supplement wrote that "Newman's Unquiet Grave is a substantial achievement ... John Cornwell has taken on the task of writing a biography of Newman to make his life intelligible to the largely secular public which in a few weeks will watch on television the ceremony of his beatification. He has followed a via media between the hagiography of Meriol Trevor and the mockery of Lytton Strachey, and he has produced a Life which is readable, sympathetic and judicious ... Altogether, he has succeeded in building up a vivid picture of Newman's personality."

== Science, Ethics and Humanities ==
As Research Fellow (elected 1990, Fellow Commoner 1996) and Director of the Science and Human Dimension Project at Jesus College, Cambridge, Cornwell has brought together many scientists, philosophers, ethicists, authors and journalists to debate and discuss a range of topics. His books in the field of public understanding of science include Nature's Imagination, Consciousness and Human Identity, and Explanations, all published by Oxford University Press. His journalism in this field has been published in a variety of outlets including Financial Times, Sunday Times Magazine, The Observer, New Statesman, New Scientist, Nature, Prospect, Times Literary Supplement, The Tablet, Brain, New Scientist, The Guardian, and The Times. Broadcast contributions to many BBC programmes, especially on culture, science and religion, including Hard Talk, Choice, Start the Week, The Moral Maze (e.g., witness on genetic determinism debate), Today (e.g., debate with Richard Dawkins); Beyond Belief (on John Henry Newman's The Idea of a University), Thought for the Day (on Darwin's birthday), Sunday, and various programmes in the BBC's World Service.

== Rustat Conferences ==
From 2009 to 2017, he was director of the Rustat Conferences, also based at Jesus College, Cambridge. This project brought together academics with those from politics, business, the media and education to discuss the vital issues of the day in a roundtable format. The first two meetings in 2009 discussed the global Economic Crisis, and the Future of Democracy. The third meeting addressed Infrastructure and the Future of Society – infrastructure for energy security, cities of the future, and water.

== Works ==
- The Spoiled Priest (1969)
- Seven Other Demons (1971)
- Coleridge, Poet and Revolutionary, 1772–1804: A Critical Biography (1973)
- Free and Balanced (1979)
- Earth to Earth: A True Story of the Lives and Violent Deaths of a Devon Farming Family (1982)
- A Thief in the Night: The Mysterious Death of Pope John Paul I (1989) ISBN 9780141001838
- Powers of Darkness, Powers of Light (also published as The Hiding Places of God) (1991)
- Strange Gods (1993)
- Nature's Imagination: The Frontiers of Scientific Vision (editor) (1995)
- The Power to Harm: Mind, Medicine, and Murder on Trial (1996)
- Consciousness and Human Identity (editor) (1998)
- Hitler's Pope: The Secret History of Pius XII (1999) ISBN 9780670876204
- Breaking Faith: The Pope, the People and the Fate of Catholicism (2001) ISBN 9780141004631
- Hitler's Scientists: Science, War, and the Devil's Pact (2003) ISBN 9780670030750
- Explanations: Styles of Explanation in Science (editor) (2004)
- The Pontiff in Winter (2004) ISBN 9780739318478
- Seminary Boy (2006) ISBN 9780385514866
- Darwin's Angel (2007)
- Philosophers and God: At the Frontiers of Faith and Reason (co-editor with Michael McGhee) (2009)
- Newman's Unquiet Grave: The Reluctant Saint (2010)
- Meditations of Samuel Taylor Coleridge (editor) (2012)
- The Dark Box: A Secret History of Confession (2014)
- Church, Interrupted: Havoc & Hope: The Tender Revolt of Pope Francis (2021)
