= The Telling Room =

2013 book by Michael Paterniti

- First edition
- Author: Michael Paterniti
- Language: English
- Subject: Culinary
- Published: 2013
- Publisher: The Dial Press
- Publication place: USA
- Pages: 368
- ISBN: 978-0385337007

The Telling Room: A Tale of Love, Betrayal, Revenge, and the World's Greatest Piece of Cheese is a book by Michael Paterniti about a Spanish cheese, Páramo de Guzmán, and its maker, first published in July 2013. It was featured on BBC Radio 4's Book of the Week during January 2014.
