= Hitler's Scientists =

2003 book by John Cornwell

- First edition
- Author: John Cornwell
- Language: English
- Genre: Non-fiction
- Publisher: Viking Press
- Publication date: 2003

Hitler's Scientists is a book by John Cornwell describing scientific life in Germany in the buildup to, during, and after World War II. Detailed is the discrimination and persecution of scientists' groups marginalized by Nazi Germany—such as the Jews, the failed development of a nuclear weapon, the development of rocket technology, and the human experiments performed during World War II.

The Guardian review called the book a "timely and important study". The Independent described it as "a gripping study in moral complexity," though "This is a lot of ground to cover in a single book, and it is sometimes hard to keep in focus its sheer range of vivid material." Stanley Hoffman gave a poor review in Foreign Affairs, calling it "not a satisfactory book", stating that, "Moral issues are not examined in depth, and Cornwell offers only a glimpse of the diversity of scientists' motives for cooperating with a murderous regime.
