= Bin Laden: The Man Who Declared War on America =

1999 non-fiction book by Yossef Bodansky

- Author: Yossef Bodansky
- Subject: Osama bin Laden
- Genre: biography
- Publisher: Forum
- English publication date: 2001
- Pages: 439
- ISBN: 0-7615-1968-8 for 2001 ed.
- OCLC: 48093501
- Dewey Decimal: 958.1046092
- LC Class: HV6430.B55 B63

Bin Laden: The Man Who Declared War on America (ISBN 0-7615-1968-8) is a New York Times Bestseller by Yossef Bodansky, the former Director of the Congressional Task Force on Terrorism and Unconventional Warfare.

The book provides a full account of the rise of Osama bin Laden and discusses Islamism. Bodansky concludes "Ultimately, the quintessence of bin Laden's threat is his being a cog, albeit an important one, in a large system that will outlast his own demise -- state-sponsored international terrorism." The book details support from Sudan and Afghanistan but claims that perhaps bin Laden's biggest supporter is Iran. Bodansky also alleges a cooperative relationship between Saddam Hussein and al-Qaeda. The book's success as best-seller was amid controversy of a purported political agenda therein.
