= David Lefer =

American writer and professor

David G. Lefer is an American professor, journalist, and author, who holds the post of Industry Professor at New York University's Tandon School of Engineering, where he directs and teaches the Innovation and Technology Forum class.

A 1994 honors graduate of Harvard College, Lefer obtained a master's degree in 1995 from Columbia University's School of Journalism.

He worked as a journalist for the New York Daily News, Newsday, the Pittsburgh Post-Gazette, and The China News in Taiwan. He was also a co-producer of the PBS talk show The Digital Age. Lefer co-wrote the book They Made America (Little, Brown 2004), with Harold Evans and Gail Buckland. This history of American innovation was subsequently made into a four-part PBS series, which Lefer helped to produce. Fortune Magazine named the book one of the top 100 business books of the past 75 years, and the Los Angeles Times review praised its educational value, although the New York Times was less complimentary. According to WorldCat, the book is in 1596 libraries.

Lefer is also the author of The Founding Conservatives: How a Group of Unsung Heroes Saved the American Revolution, published by Penguin in June 2013. The book was favorably reviewed in the Washington Times and the National Review, and by The Kirkus Review and Publishers Weekly.
