= Peter Beinart =

American columnist, journalist, and political commentator (born 1971)

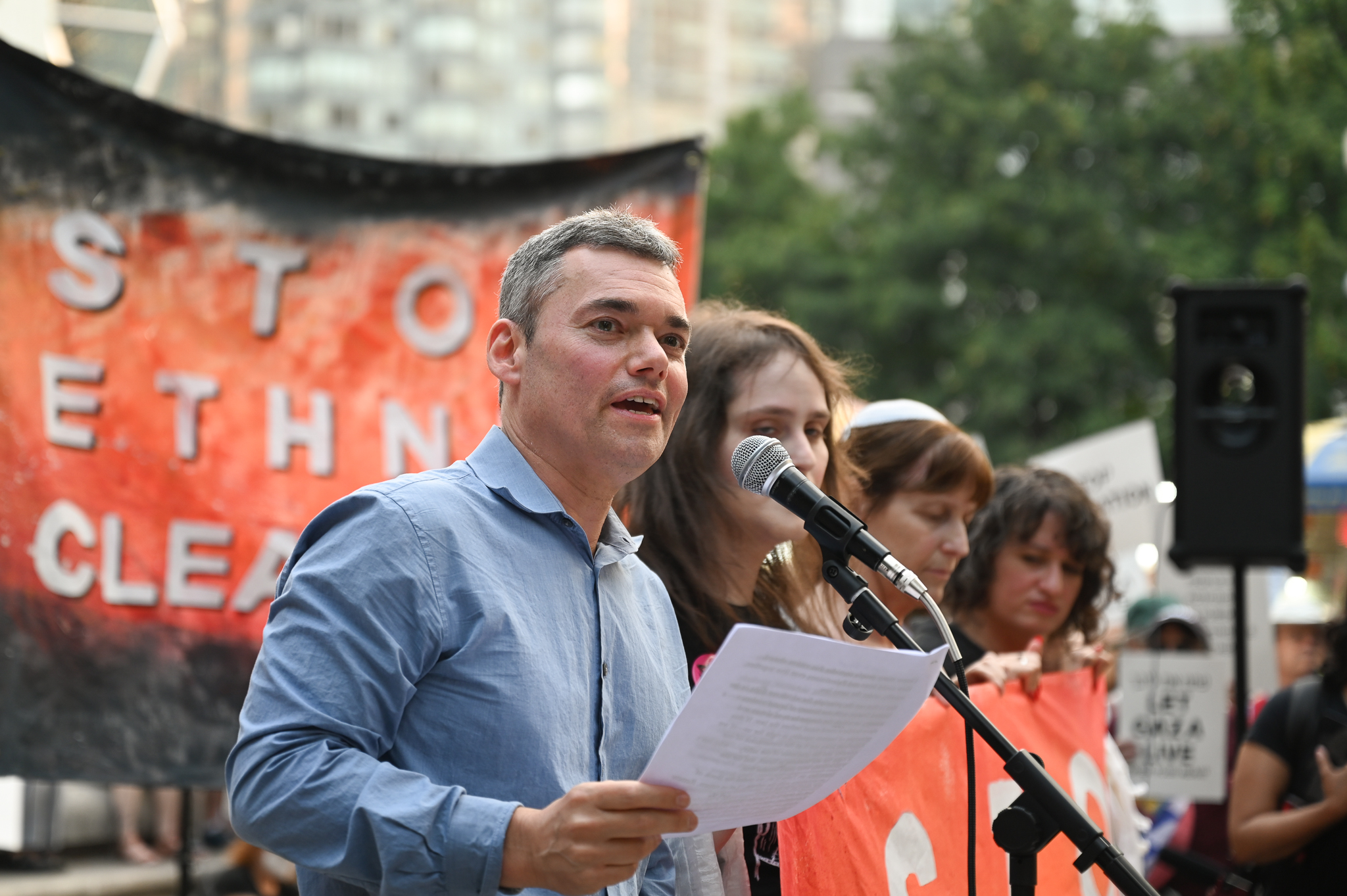
- Beinart in 2025, by Gili Getz
- Born: Peter Alexander Beinart; February 28, 1971 (age 55); Cambridge, Massachusetts, U.S.
- Education: Yale University (BA); University College, Oxford (MPhil)
- Spouse: Diana Hartstein (m. 2003)
- Children: 2
- Relatives: Robert Brustein (stepfather)
- Website: https://peterbeinart.net

Peter Alexander Beinart (/ˈbaɪnərt/; born February 28, 1971) is an American liberal columnist, journalist, and political commentator. A former editor of The New Republic, he has also written for Time, The Atlantic, and The New York Review of Books, among other periodicals. He has written four books.

He is a professor of journalism and political science at the Craig Newmark Graduate School of Journalism at the City University of New York. He is an editor-at-large at Jewish Currents, a contributing opinion columnist at The New York Times, a political commentator for MSNBC, CNN, and a fellow at the Foundation for Middle East Peace.

== Early life and education ==
Beinart was born in Cambridge, Massachusetts. His parents were Jewish immigrants from South Africa. His maternal grandfather was from Russia, and his maternal grandmother, who was Sephardic, was from Egypt. His father's parents were from Lithuania. His mother, Doreen (née Pienaar), is a former director of the human-rights film program at the John F. Kennedy School of Government at Harvard University, and his father, Julian Beinart, is a former professor of architecture at the Massachusetts Institute of Technology. His stepfather is theatre critic and playwright Robert Brustein.

Beinart attended Buckingham Browne & Nichols School in Cambridge, graduating in 1989. He then studied history and political science at Yale College, where he was a member of the Yale Political Union and graduated in 1993 with the Alpheus Henry Snow Prize. He was awarded a Rhodes Scholarship to study at University College, Oxford, where he earned an M.Phil. in international relations in 1995.

== Career ==
Beinart worked at The New Republic as the managing editor from 1995 to 1997, then as senior editor until 1999, and as the magazine's editor from 1999 to 2006. For much of that time he also wrote The New Republic's "TRB" column, which was reprinted in the New York Post and other newspapers. From 2007 until 2009 he was a Senior Fellow at the Council on Foreign Relations. Beinart is associate professor of journalism and political science at the City University of New York. He has written for Time, The New York Times, The New York Review of Books, and other periodicals. He has appeared on various TV news discussion programs and is a political commentator for MSNBC. His editor-in-chief at the Forward called him a "wunderkind". He was also a senior political writer for The Daily Beast. On March 12, 2012, Beinart launched a new group blog, "Zion Square", renamed "Open Zion" two weeks later, at The Daily Beast/Newsweek. Also in 2012, Beinart was included on Foreign Policy magazine's list of 100 top global thinkers.

On November 4, 2013, Haaretz announced that Beinart would be hired as a columnist beginning January 1, 2014. The same day, the Atlantic Media Company said he would join National Journal and write for The Atlantic's website beginning in January, and a statement from The Daily Beast said "Open Zion" would cease. In 2017, Beinart left Haaretz and became a columnist for The Forward, where he stayed until 2020, when he joined Jewish Currents as an editor-at-large.

In August 2018, Beinart was detained by Shin Bet at Israel's Ben Gurion Airport and questioned about his presence at West Bank protests and outspoken criticism of the Israeli government's policies toward the Palestinians. Beinart called his experience "trivial" when compared to the experiences of others, particularly Palestinians and Palestinian Americans who travel through Israel's main airport. A statement issued by the Prime Minister's Office said Benjamin Netanyahu asked the Israeli security forces how it happened and was told that Beinart's detention was an administrative mistake. The statement continued, "Israel is an open society which welcomes all—critics and supporters alike."

== Works and views ==
Beinart was the editor of The New Republic when the publication editorially supported the 2003 Invasion of Iraq; Beinart was identified as one of the major forces behind the magazine's support for the war. In 2004, a New Republic editorial written during his editorial tenure assessed its support for the Iraq War thus: "We feel regret, but no shame. ... Our strategic rationale for war has collapsed." In 2010, Beinart said he was motivated to support the Iraq War by a concern that Saddam Hussein was developing nuclear weapons, a concern that proved to be unfounded.

Beinart is the author of the 2006 book The Good Fight: Why Liberals—and Only Liberals—Can Win the War on Terror and Make America Great Again. The book, which grew out of a 2004 article in The New Republic arguing that Democrats need to take the threat of Islamic totalitarianism more seriously, is a liberal defense of muscular interventionism abroad, particularly with a view to reforming various nations in the Middle East.

Beinart's second book, The Icarus Syndrome: A History of American Hubris (2010), was born from his desire to understand how he had gotten the Iraq War so wrong. It "look[ed] back at the past hundred years of U.S. foreign policy in the baleful light of recent events [and found] the ground littered with [...] the remnants of large ideas and unearned confidence [as demonstrable in] a study of three needless wars", World War I, the Vietnam War, and the Iraq War.

Beinart's third book Is The Crisis of Zionism (2012). It describes his views on the Israeli–Palestinian conflict. Particularly, Beinart contends that policies advocated by Zionists, especially under Benjamin Netanyahu's Likud government, are increasingly at odds with liberal ideals and called the idea of "a Jewish and democratic state [...] a contradiction". Beinart supports a one-state solution, "in which Jewish and Palestinian safety are not mutually exclusive but intertwined."

In 2016, Beinart argued that greater military engagement against ISIS could be detrimental to the U.S.

Beinart's fourth book, Being Jewish After the Destruction of Gaza: A Reckoning, was released in January 2025. In it, he calls for an end to the apartheid system in Israel, and argues that "Jewish texts, history, and language have been deployed to justify mass slaughter and starvation" against Palestinians in the Gaza war.

== Personal life ==
As of 2012, Beinart lives in New York City with his wife and two children. He keeps kosher, regularly attends an Orthodox synagogue, and has sent his children to a Jewish day school.

== Publications ==
- The Good Fight: Why Liberals—and Only Liberals—Can Win the War on Terror. New York, New York: HarperCollins. 2006. ISBN 978-0-06-084161-4.
- The Icarus Syndrome: A History of American Hubris. New York, New York: HarperCollins. 2010. ISBN 978-0-06-145646-6.
- Peter Beinart (June 10, 2010). "The Failure of the American Jewish Establishment". The New York Review of Books.
- The Crisis of Zionism. New York, New York: Times Books. 2012. ISBN 978-0-8050-9412-1.
- Being Jewish After the Destruction of Gaza: A Reckoning. New York, New York: Alfred A. Knopf. 2025. ISBN 978-0-5938-0389-9.
