= Babylon by Bus (book) =

2006 book by Ray Lemoine and Jeff Neumann

Babylon By Bus
- First edition
- Author: Ray Lemoine, Jeff Neumann (with Donovan Webster)
- Language: English
- Subject: Travel
- Genre: Nonfiction
- Publisher: Penguin Books
- Publication date: 2006
- Publication place: United States
- Media type: Print (Hardback)
- Pages: 311 pp
- ISBN: 1-59420-091-2 (hardcover)
- OCLC: 65521644
- Dewey Decimal: 956.7044/3092 B 22
- LC Class: DS79.76 .L46 2006

Babylon by Bus is a 2006 book by two friends, Ray Lemoine and Jeff Neumann, who gave up their valuable franchise selling "Yankees Suck" T-Shirts at Fenway Park to find meaning and adventure in Iraq, where they became employed by the occupation in jobs for which they lacked qualification and witnessed much that amazed and disturbed them.

The book is written from Lemoine's point of view.

== Summary ==
The book starts out with Lemoine and Neumann at Yankee Stadium, a baseball stadium in Bronx, New York. A turn of events in the Boston Red Sox vs. New York Yankees game leaves them feeling down, and the two find themselves wanting to travel to somewhere they have never been before.

The book is then set in Post-War Iraq, which is occupied by the American military, and the CPA.
