= List of University of Florida alumni =

This list of University of Florida alumni includes current students, former students, and graduates of the University of Florida in Gainesville, Florida. Honorary degree recipients can be found on the list of University of Florida honorary degree recipients, and notable administration, faculty, and staff are found on the list of University of Florida faculty and administrators.

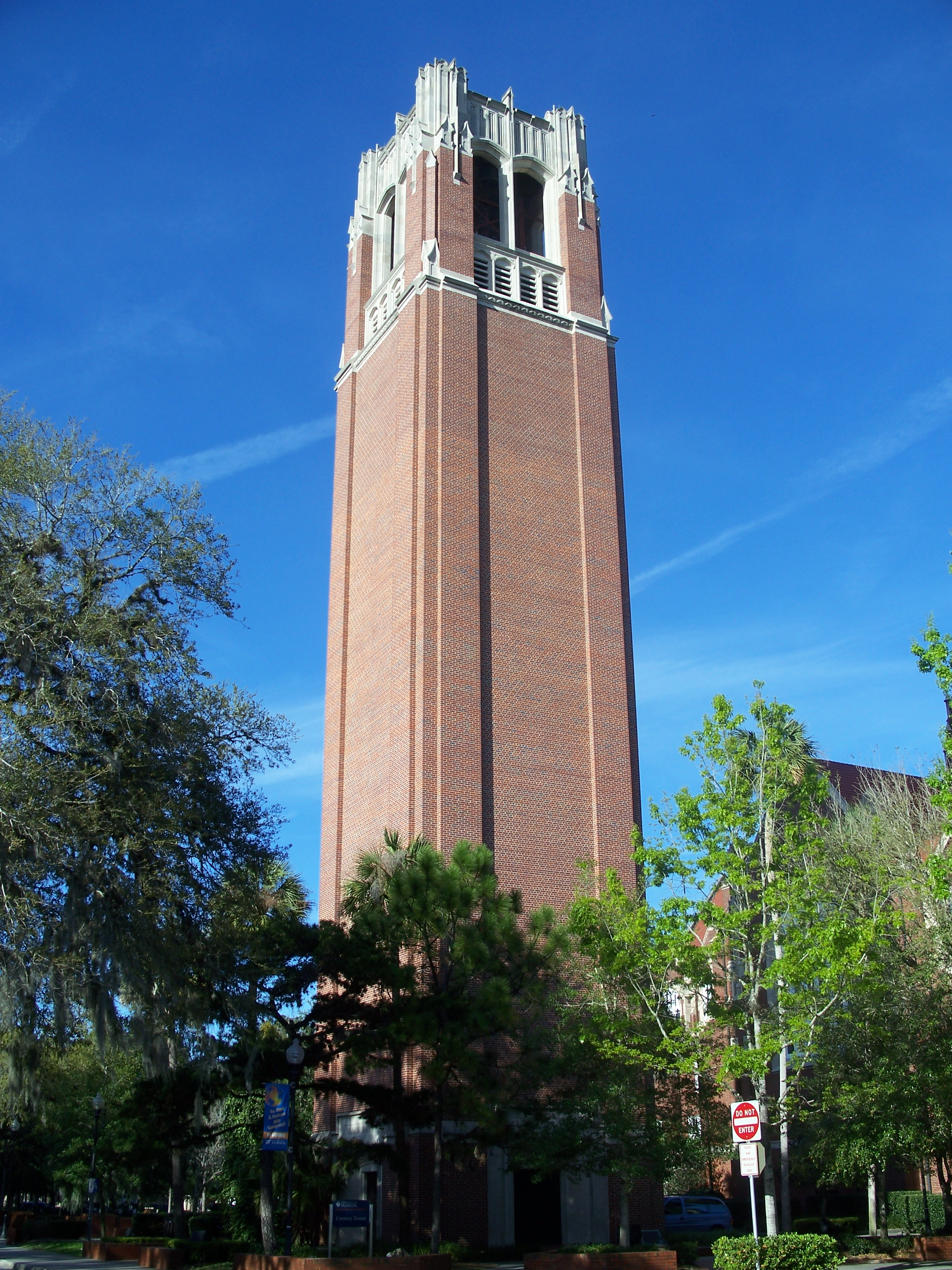
Century Tower – a tribute to the students and alumni who died in World War I and World War II

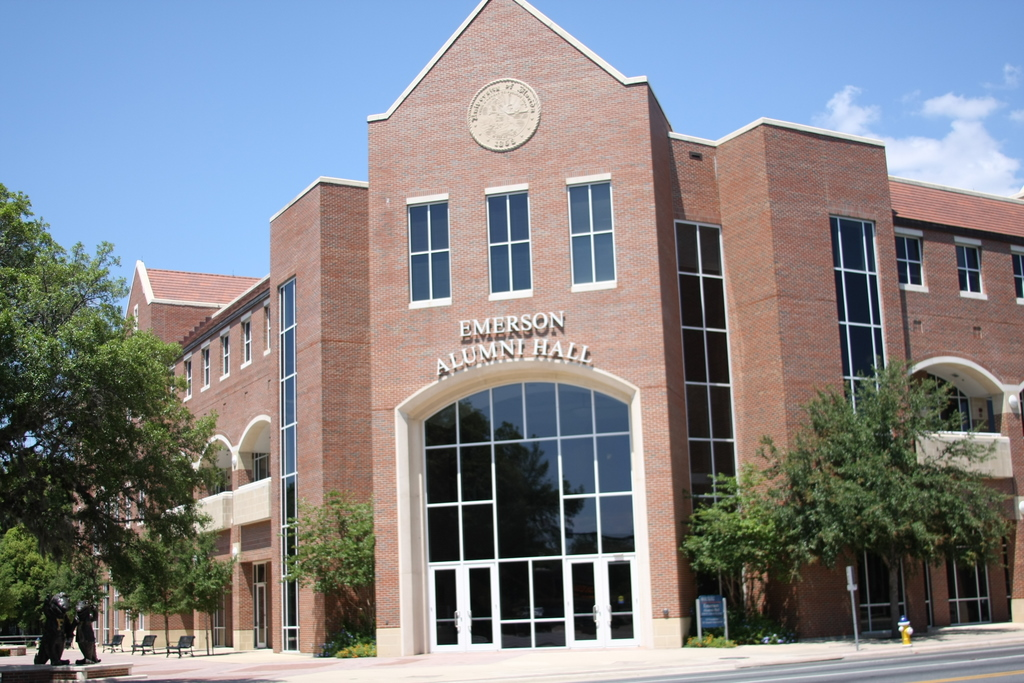
University of Florida Alumni Association

== Engineering, science, and mathematics ==
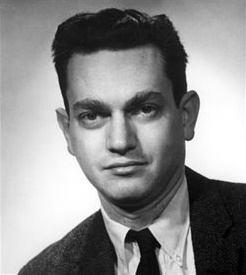
Dr. Marshall Nirenberg

Dr. Nils Diaz

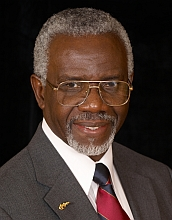
Dr. Jonathan Earle

Dr. Pramod Khargonekar

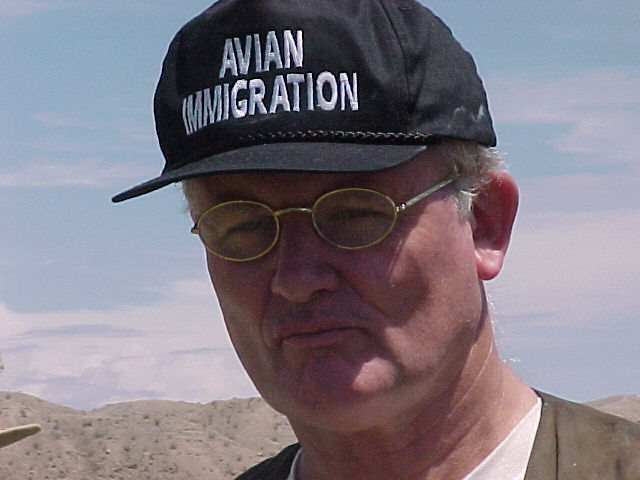
Peter Pritchard

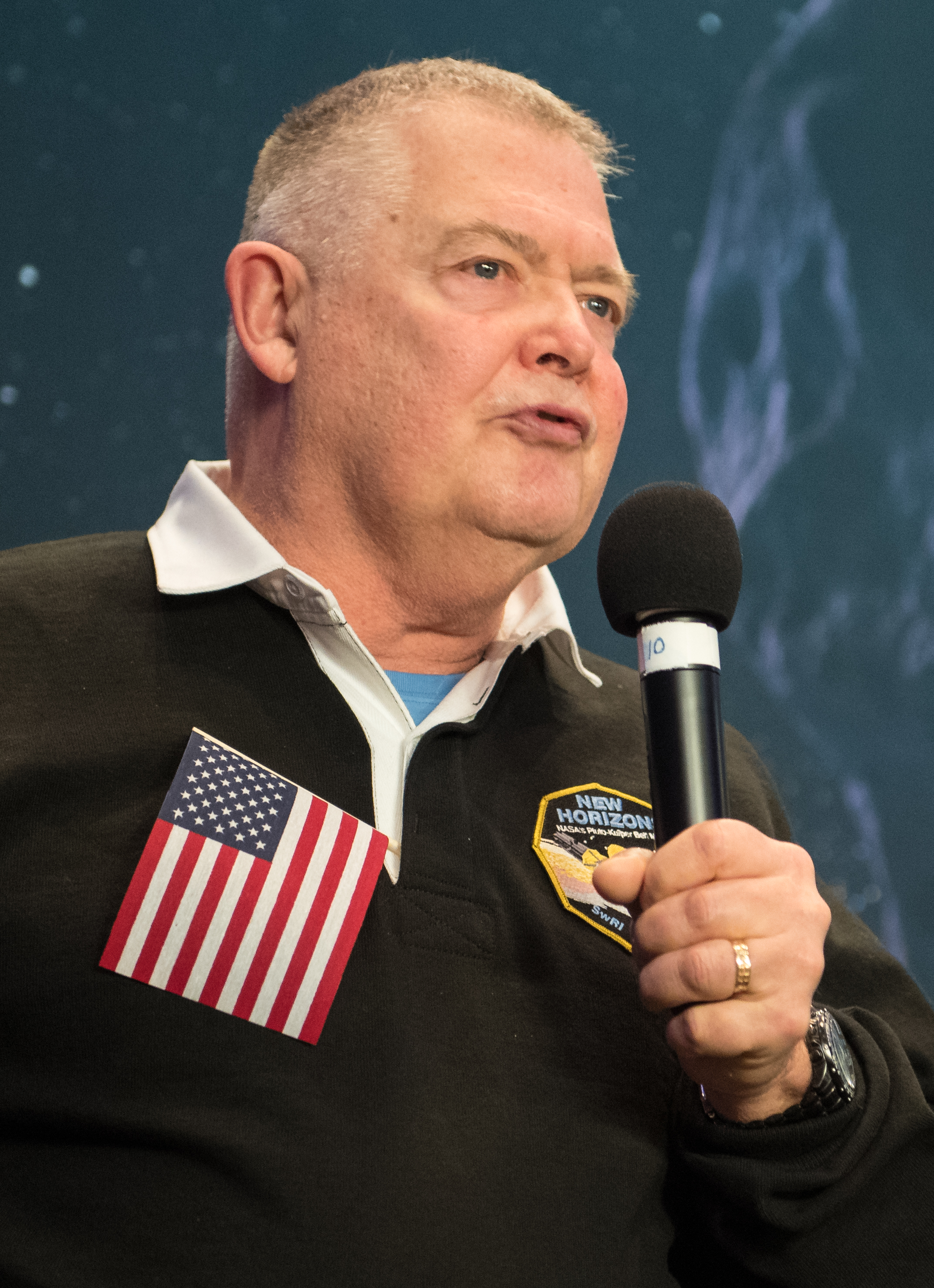
Dr. Michael Ryschkewitsch

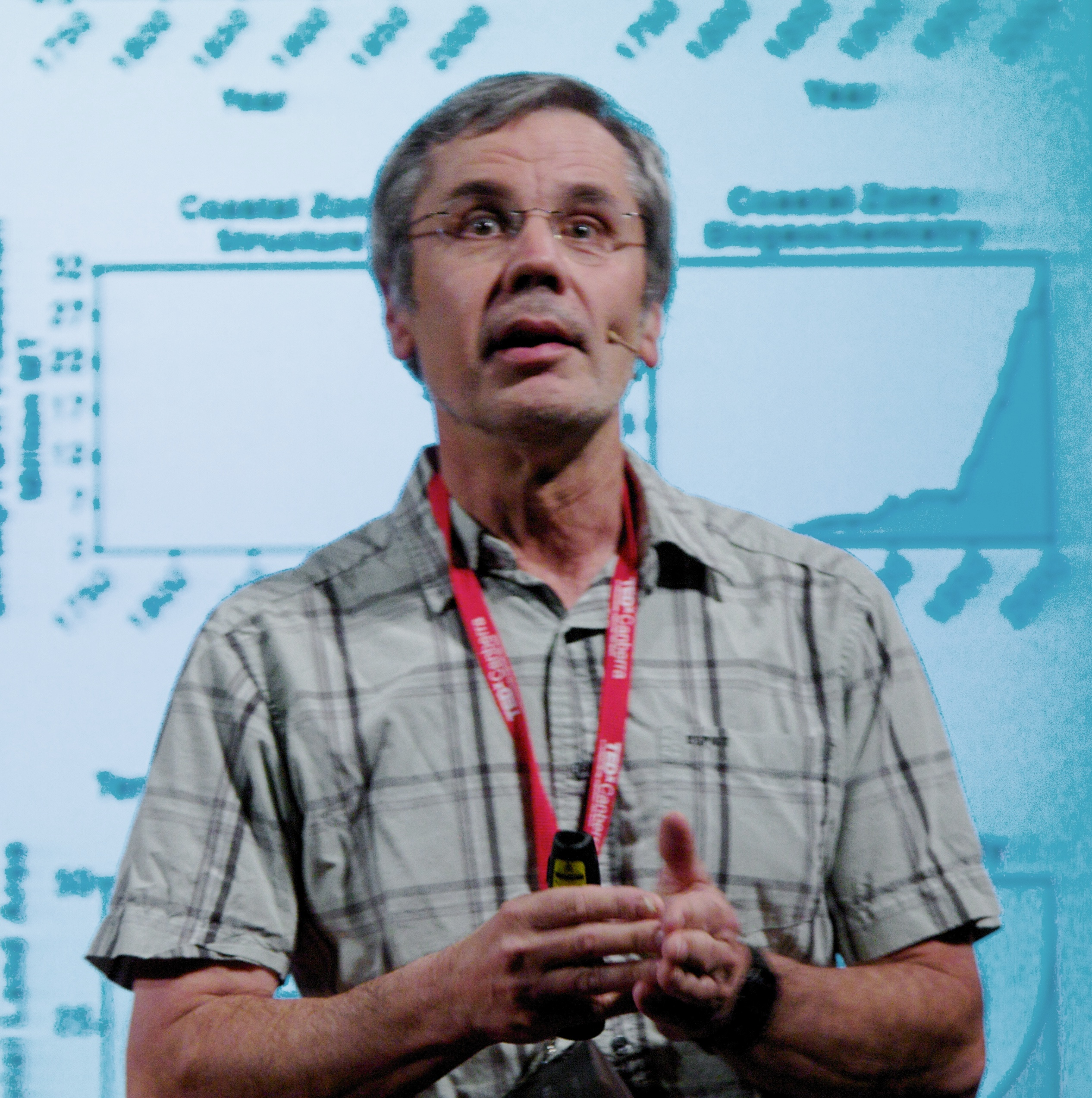
Dr. Will Steffen

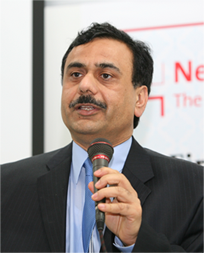
Dr. Ashutosh Tewari

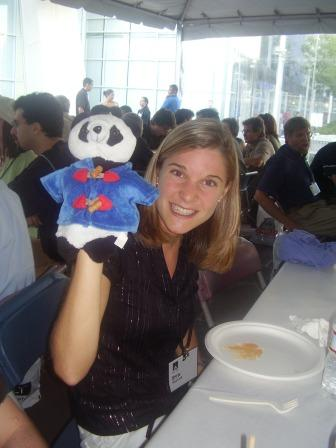
Eva Vertes

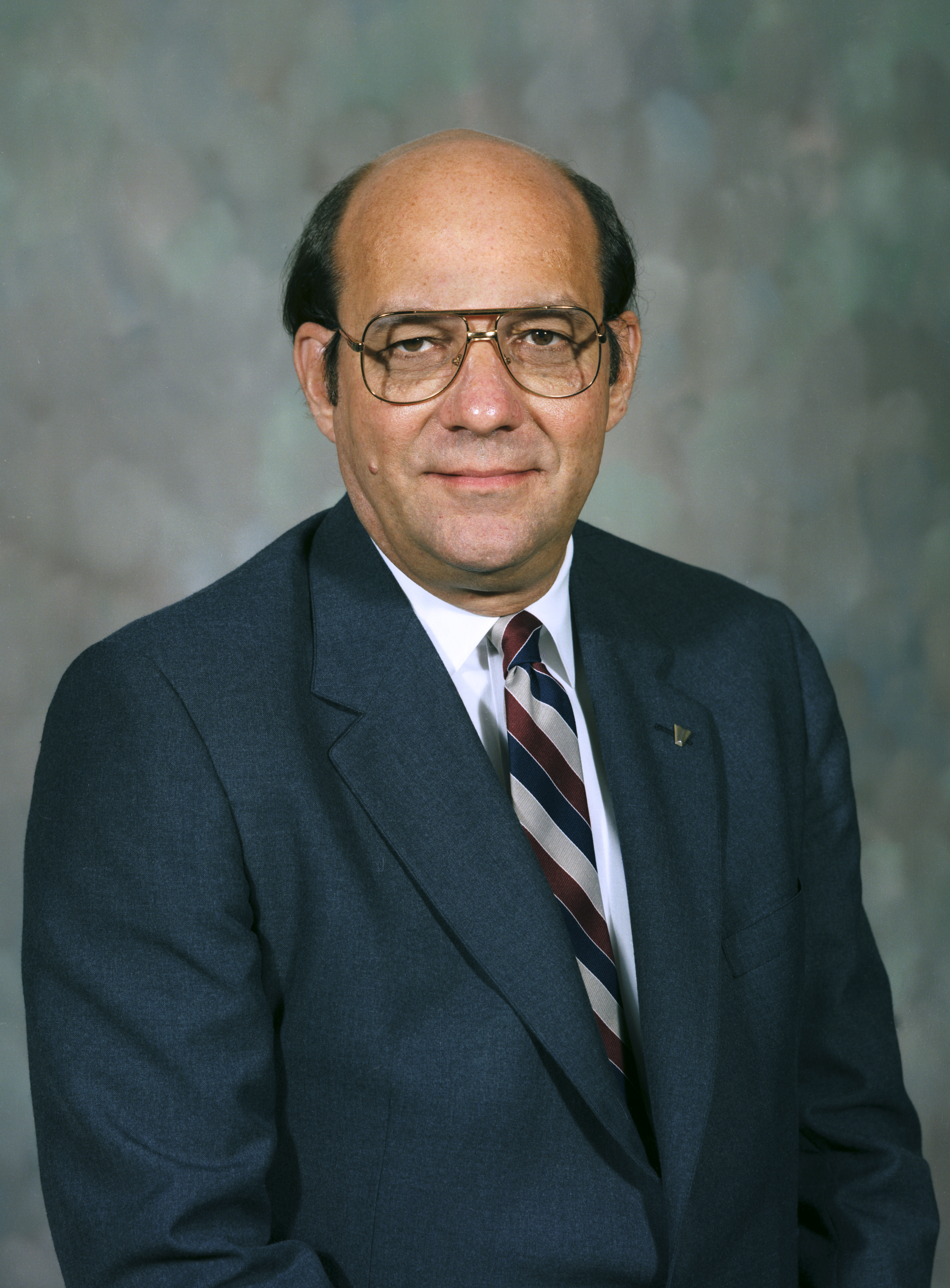
Dr. James Thompson

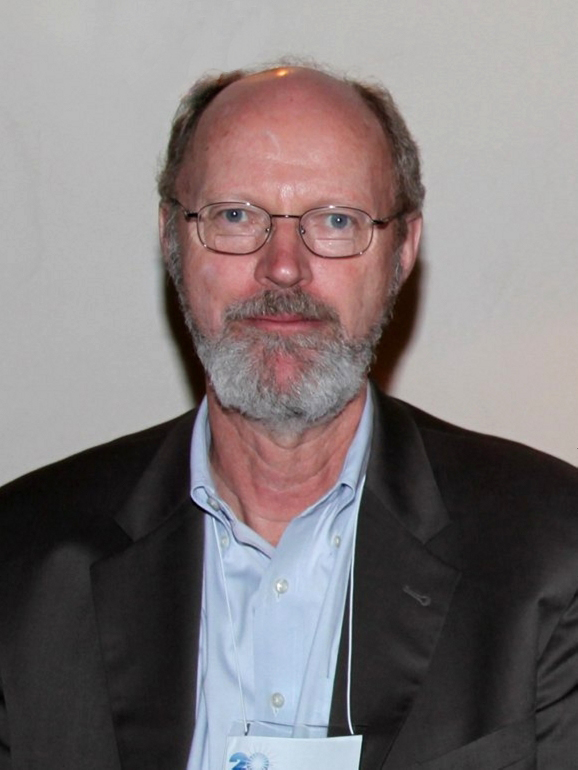
Dr. Robert Grubbs

- Mark Adler, researcher, known for his work in data compression, and creator of zlib and gzip
- James Allchin, developed Microsoft operating systems, former executive
- Miguel Altieri, agroecologist at the University of California, Berkeley
- John D. Anderson, curator of aerodynamics at the National Air and Space Museum
- John Vincent Atanasoff, inventor of the first automatic electronic digital computer
- C. D. Atkins, co-creator of frozen orange juice concentrate
- Marc Baldus, physicist and expert in solid-state NMR spectroscopy
- Rodney J. Bartlett, chemist, Guggenheim Fellow
- Marston Bates, zoologist and fellow with the American Academy of Arts and Sciences
- Sidney W. Bijou, developmental psychologist
- Christina Bloebaum, systems engineer
- George F. Bond, physician, father of saturation diving
- Karen Ramey Burns, forensic anthropologist, Fulbright Scholar
- Brian Caffo, winner of the Presidential Early Career Award for Scientists and Engineers
- Berry L. Cannon, aquanaut
- Archie Carr, zoologist, conservationist, and founder of the Caribbean Conservation Corporation
- Marjorie Harris Carr, pioneer in the American Conservation Movement
- Amitava Chattopadhyay, professor in Corporate Innovation
- Jack Clemons, aerospace engineer and air and space industry professional
- Paul Cootner, financial economist
- Robert Costanza, ecological economist, Gund Professor of Ecological economics and director of the Gund Institute for Ecological Economics at the University of Vermont
- Thomas R. Cundari, director of the Center for Advanced Scientific Computing and Modeling
- Thomas Des Jean, anthropologist
- Nils J. Diaz, former chairman of the Nuclear Regulatory Commission
- Jonathan F. Earle, engineer, received the Presidential Award for Excellence in Science, Mathematics and Engineering Mentoring
- G. B. Edwards, taxonomic entomologist specializing primarily in spiders
- John F. Eisenberg, zoologist
- David Ehrenfeld, biologist and author
- Wesley R. Elsberry, marine biologist
- Philip Don Estridge, led development of the original IBM Personal Computer (PC), known as "father of the IBM PC"
- Manuel Fernandez, entrepreneur, guiding force behind the Gavilan SC, the first laptop computer
- Fred Gage, researcher of Alzheimer's disease and the spinal cord
- Jesse James Garrett, experience designer, who coined the term Ajax
- Jürgen Gauß, German theoretical chemist
- Robert Gentry, nuclear physicist and creationist advocate
- Thomas Gillespie, professor and chair of Environmental Sciences, Emory University
- John W. Griffin, archaeologist, researcher, administrator, and author
- Keith E. Gubbins, member of the National Academy of Engineering in the chemistry section
- Herbert Gursky, former superintendent of the Naval Research Laboratory's Space Science Division
- Kelsie Harder, onomastician
- Steven Hebert, nephrologist
- Richard Highton, zoologist, current professor emeritus of biology at the University of Maryland
- Shere Hite, sex educator and feminist
- Horton H. Hobbs Jr., carcinologist, and former head curator of the United States National Museum
- James Hollan, cognitive scientist, professor at University of California, San Diego
- Nicholas Honerkamp, archaeologist
- George Kauffman, former professor emeritus of chemistry, Guggenheim Fellow
- Jerold Kemp, researcher in the field of Instructional Design
- Pramod Khargonekar, former dean of the University of Florida College of Engineering, control system theorist
- Thomas Kilduff, neuroscientist and the director of SRI International's Center for Neuroscience
- Bruce C. Kone, former dean of the University of Florida College of Medicine
- Martin Kreitman, geneticist, professor at the University of Chicago
- Kenney Krysko, herpetologist
- Jenna Jambeck, environmental engineer
- Thomas Des Jean, anthropologist
- Alan M. Jones, cell biologist, Kenan Distinguished Professor, University of North Carolina at Chapel Hill
- Capers Jones, software engineer
- Joseph C. Joyce, current executive vice president of the Institute of Food and Agricultural Sciences
- Reynol Junco, psychologist and social media researcher, fellow at Harvard University
- K Ullas Karanth, Indian zoologist
- Seymour London, physician, and inventor of the first automatic blood pressure monitor
- Ira Longini, biostatistician and infectious disease epidemiologist
- Robert Love, author, speaker, and open source software developer
- Louis G. MacDowell, co-creator of frozen orange juice concentrate
- Ron Magill, wildlife expert, photographer and communications director for the regional Miami-Dade Zoological Park and Gardens
- Chris Malachowsky, computer scientist and co-founder of NVIDIA
- M. Cristina Marchetti, physicist, professor at University of California, Santa Barbara
- Preston McAfee, current vice president of Yahoo! Research
- Edwin H. McConkey, biologist who studies evolution, current professor emeritus at the University of Colorado
- Jerald Milanich, anthropologist and archaeologist
- William J. Mitsch, ecologist
- Lee Ann Newsom, anthropologist, and MacArthur Fellow
- Nandini Nimbkar, current president of the Nimbkar Agricultural Research Institute in India
- Carole C. Noon, primatologist, founder of Save the Chimps
- Jerald Paul, former Deputy Administrator for the National Nuclear Security Administration
- Maryly Van Leer Peck, first woman to receive an M.S. and a PhD in chemical engineering at University of Florida, president at Polk Community College
- Gary John Previts, accountant, professor of Leadership and Enterprise Development
- David Price, anthropologist
- Peter Pritchard, zoologist
- Anil K. Rajvanshi, mechanical engineer, and current director of the Nimbkar Agricultural Research Institute in India
- K. R. Rao, electrical engineer and co-inventor of the Discrete cosine transform
- Michael Reynolds, astronomer
- Lesa Roe, current chancellor of the University of North Texas System, and former director of the NASA's Langley Research Center in Hampton, Virginia
- Douglas A. Rossman, herpetologist
- Michael Ryschkewitsch, former chief engineer for NASA
- Melvin Sabshin, former medical director of the American Psychiatric Association
- Sudhir Sastry, food engineer, academic, and author
- Stephanie Moulton Sarkis, psychotherapist and author
- Samuel Sears, psychologist
- Dana Shires, medical researcher, member of the team that developed Gatorade
- Aseem Shukla, professor of urology at University of Pennsylvania and co-founder of Hindu American Foundation
- Stephen C. Sillett, botanist
- Robert S. Singleton, engineer, inventor, scientist, teacher of magnetics and computing
- Sung Won Sohn, Korean American economist
- Eduardo Sontag, Argentine mathematician
- Jeffrey Spieler, current director of research for USAID
- Lewis Stadler, geneticist
- David Steadman, museum curator
- Will Steffen, executive director of the ANU Climate Change Institute
- Gilbert Stork, creator of the Stork enamine alkylation, professor emeritus of chemistry at Columbia University
- Ashutosh Tewari, Indian oncologist and urologist
- Michael Thomas, entomologist
- James Thompson, former director of the NASA Marshall Space Flight Center
- Wolfgang A. Tomé, physicist
- Eva Vertes, Alzheimer's and cancer researcher
- Michael Warren, forensic anthropologist
- Annet Kirabo, researcher studying hypertension and oxidative stress, received her PhD from UFL

=== Nobel Prize laureates ===
- Robert Grubbs, winner of the Nobel Prize for Chemistry in 2005 for his work in the field of olefin metathesis
- Marshall Nirenberg, winner of the Nobel Prize for Physiology/Medicine in 1968 for describing the genetic code and how it operates in protein synthesis

=== Astronauts ===
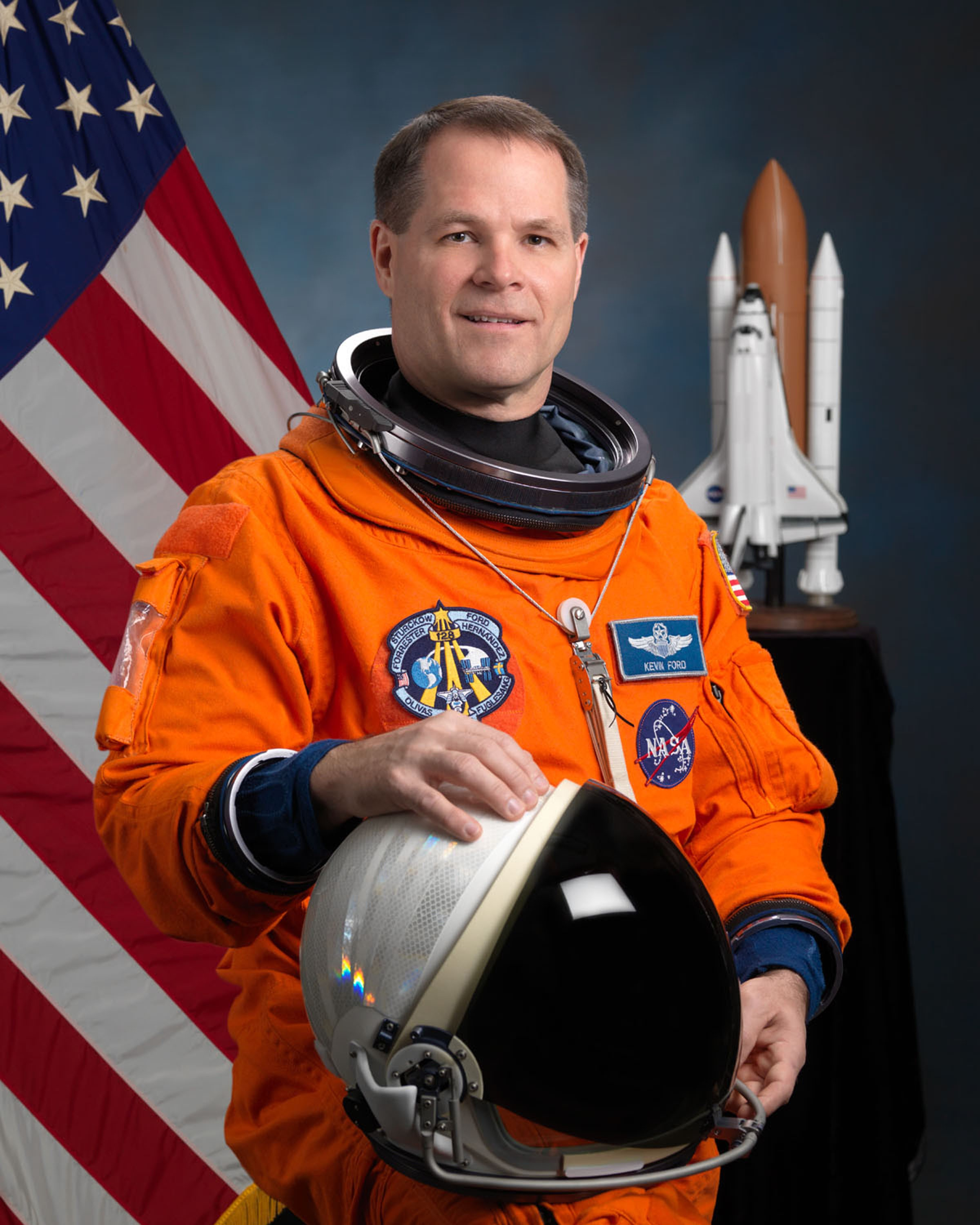
Kevin Ford

- Andrew M. Allen, former NASA astronaut, and former U.S. Marine Corps naval aviator
- William Frederick Fisher, former NASA astronaut, and current medical doctor
- Kevin A. Ford, former NASA astronaut pilot
- Fitzhugh L. Fulton, research pilot at NASA's Dryden Flight Research Center
- Ronald J. Garan, NASA astronaut, and former U.S. Air Force pilot
- Donald L. Mallick, former NASA research pilot
- Bill Nelson, former U.S. senator and former U.S. representative; Space Shuttle payload specialist astronaut (non-NASA Astronaut Corps); part of NASA initiative for placing U.S. congressional members in space until initiative suspended following Columbia accident
- Ronald A. Parise, former NASA astronaut
- Norman Thagard, former NASA astronaut, and current professor of engineering at Florida State University

== Presidents of universities and colleges ==
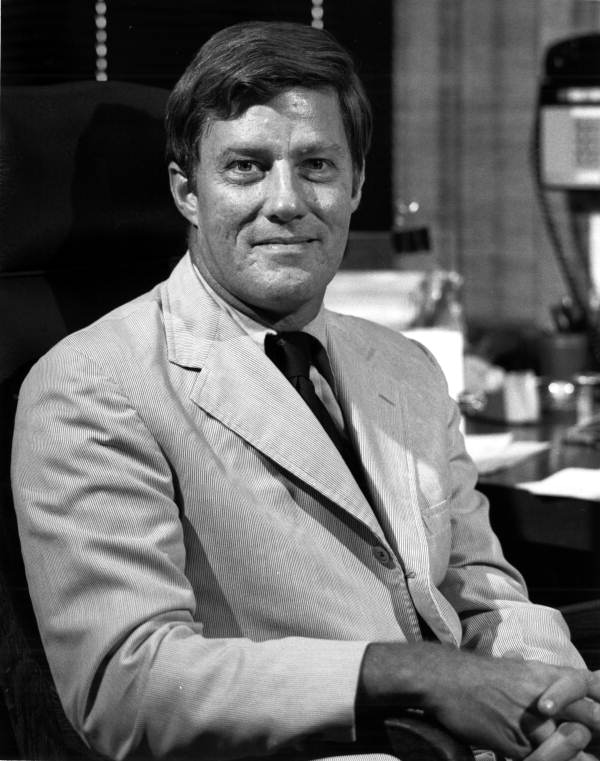
Sandy D'Alemberte

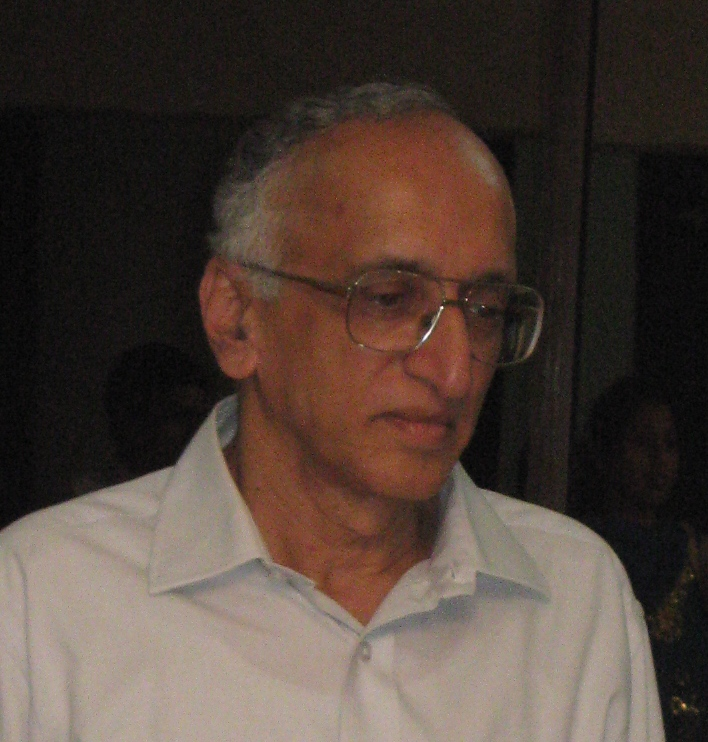
Dr. Madaboosi Ananth

- Byong Man Ahn, former president of Hankuk University of Foreign Studies in Seoul, Korea, and former Ministry of Education, Science and Technology for South Korea
- M. S. Ananth, former director of Indian Institute of Technology Madras
- M. Katherine Banks, 26th and current president of Texas A&M University
- George F. Baughman, founding president of New College of Florida
- P. George Benson, current president of the College of Charleston
- Thomas G. Carpenter, former president of Memphis State University and University of North Florida
- Marshall Criser, former president of University of Florida and former chairman of Scripps Florida
- Harold B. Crosby, former president of University of West Florida and Florida International University
- Gay Culverhouse, former president of Notre Dame College and president of the Tampa Bay Buccaneers
- Sandy D'Alemberte, former president of Florida State University and the American Bar Association
- John Delaney, former president of the University of North Florida, former chancellor of the State University System of Florida
- Donald Eastman, current president of Eckerd College
- Ray F. Ferrero Jr., former president and current chancellor of Nova Southeastern University
- Fred Gainous, former president of Florida A&M University
- S. Malcolm Gillis, former president of Rice University
- Lori Stewart Gonzalez, 23rd president of Ohio University; interim president of University of Louisville
- Madlyn L. Hanes, current president of Penn State Harrisburg
- Carl Hite, president of Cleveland State Community College, Tennessee
- Carolyn Ringer Lepre, 10th president of Salisbury University; interim president of Radford University
- Robert Lindgren, current president of Randolph-Macon College
- Charles N. Millican, founding president of the University of Central Florida
- Stephen C. O'Connell, former president of the University of Florida, former Florida Supreme Court justice
- Eduardo J. Padrón, current president of Miami Dade College
- Paul G. Pearson, former president of Miami University and former interim president of Rutgers University
- William L. Proctor, former chancellor of Flagler College
- Michael Rao, current president of Virginia Commonwealth University, and former president of Central Michigan University
- W. Reece Smith Jr., former president of the University of South Florida and the American Bar Association, and Rhodes Scholar
- Norman L. Stephens Jr., current president of South Florida State College
- Ann Stuart, current president of Texas Woman's University
- Janet Todd, current president of Lucy Cavendish College at the University of Cambridge
- E. Jean Walker, former president of Virginia Highlands Community College

== United States Cabinet members ==
Alan S. Boyd	Carol Browner	Marco Rubio	Pam Bondi	Keith Sonderling
Alan S. Boyd	Carol Browner	Marco Rubio	Pam Bondi	Keith Sonderling

- Alan S. Boyd, 1st United States Secretary of Transportation (1967–1969) under President Lyndon B. Johnson
- Carol Browner, 8th Administrator of the Environmental Protection Agency (1993–2001) under President Bill Clinton
- Marco Rubio, 72nd United States Secretary of State (2025–present) under President Donald Trump
- Pam Bondi, 87th United States Attorney General (2025–2026) under President Donald Trump
- Keith Sonderling, 31st United States Secretary of Labor (2026–present) under President Donald Trump

== Politicians, military officers, and judges ==
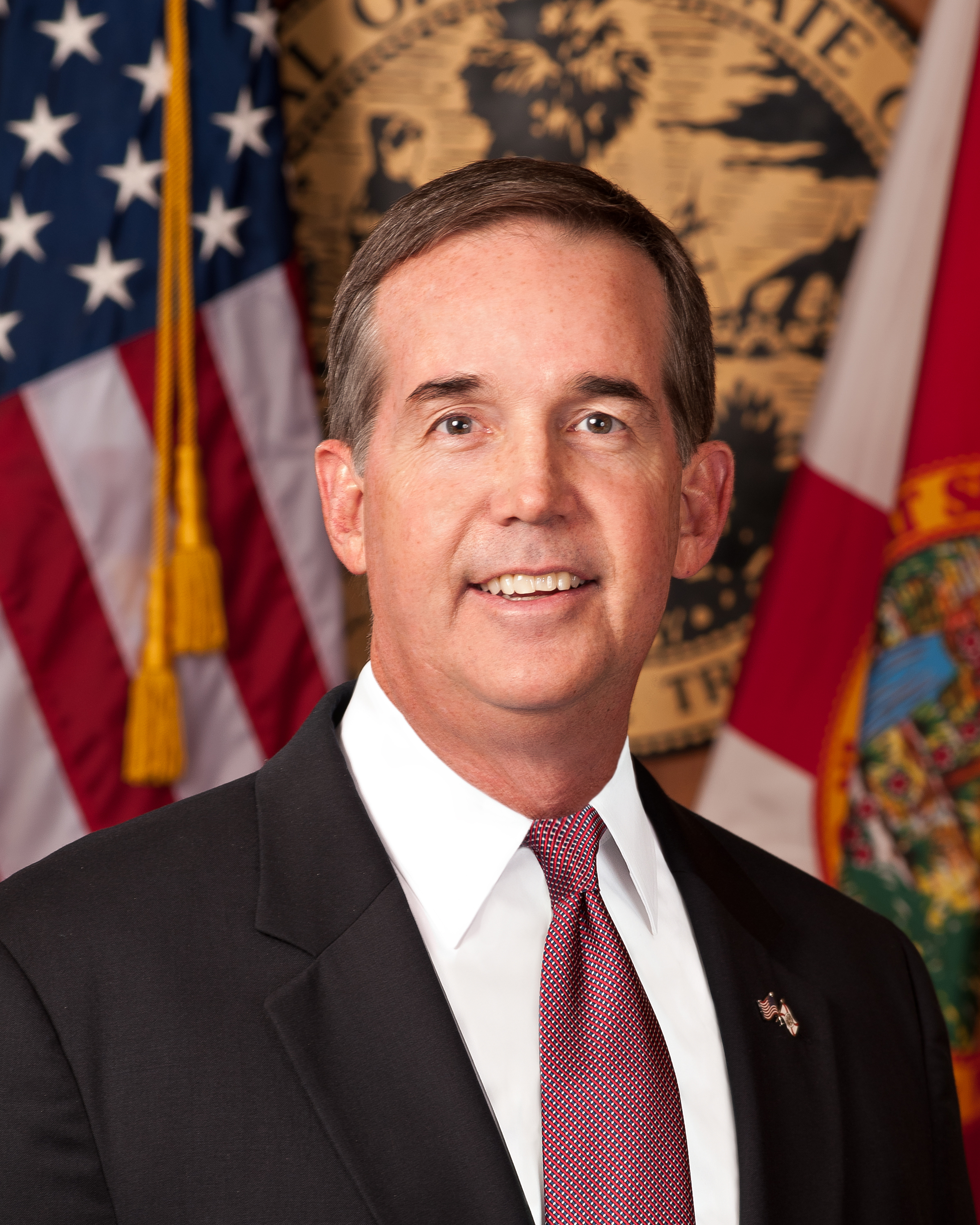
Jeffrey Atwater

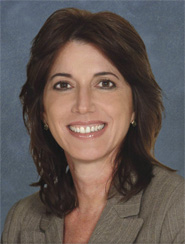
Ellyn Bogdanoff

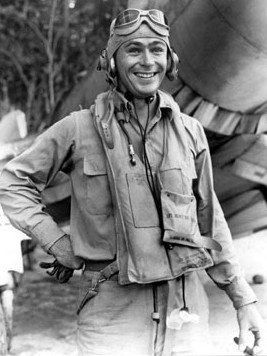
John Bolt

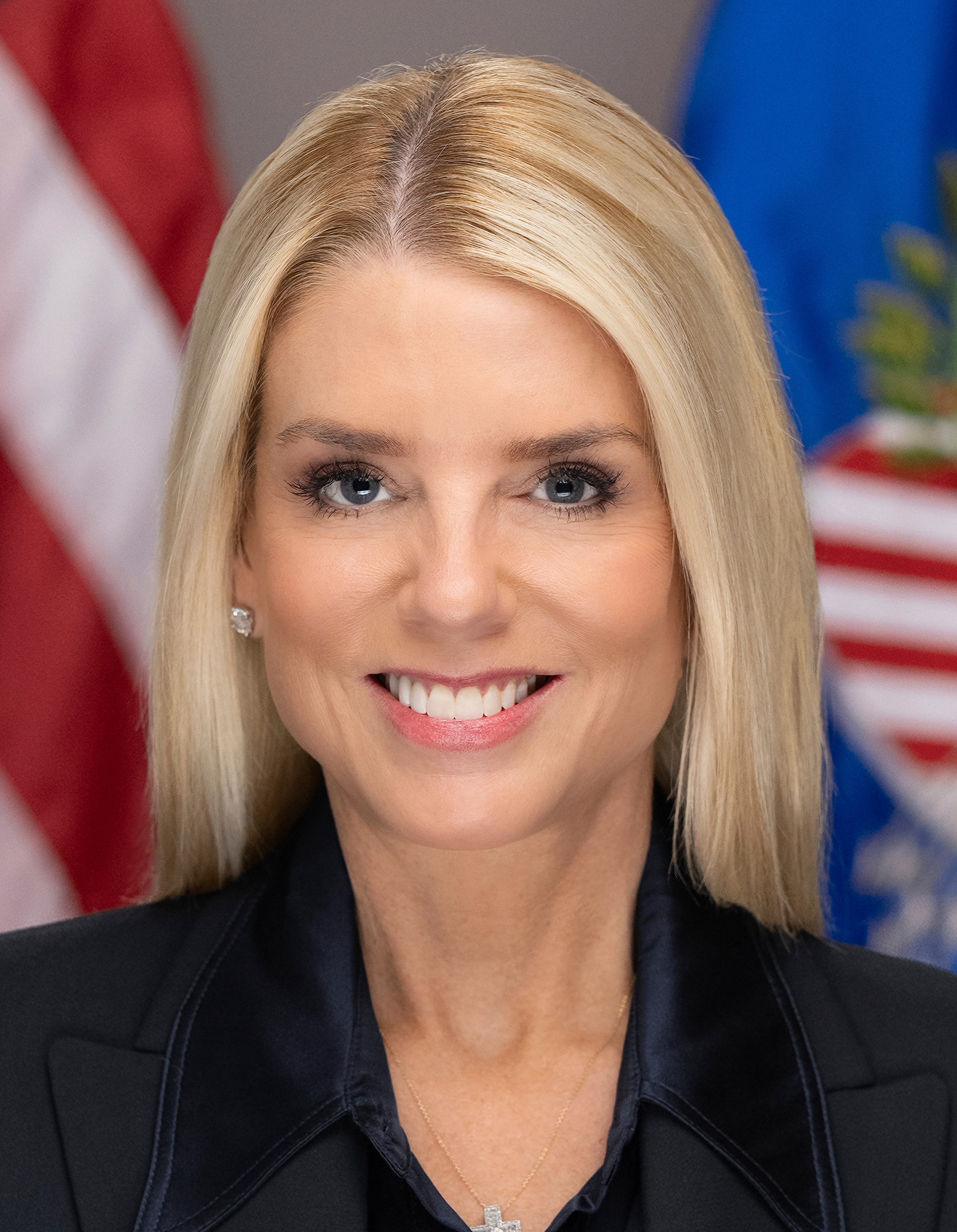
Pam Bondi

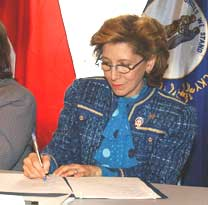
Bernadette Castro

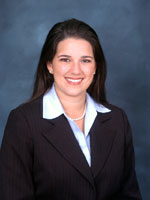
Anitere Flores

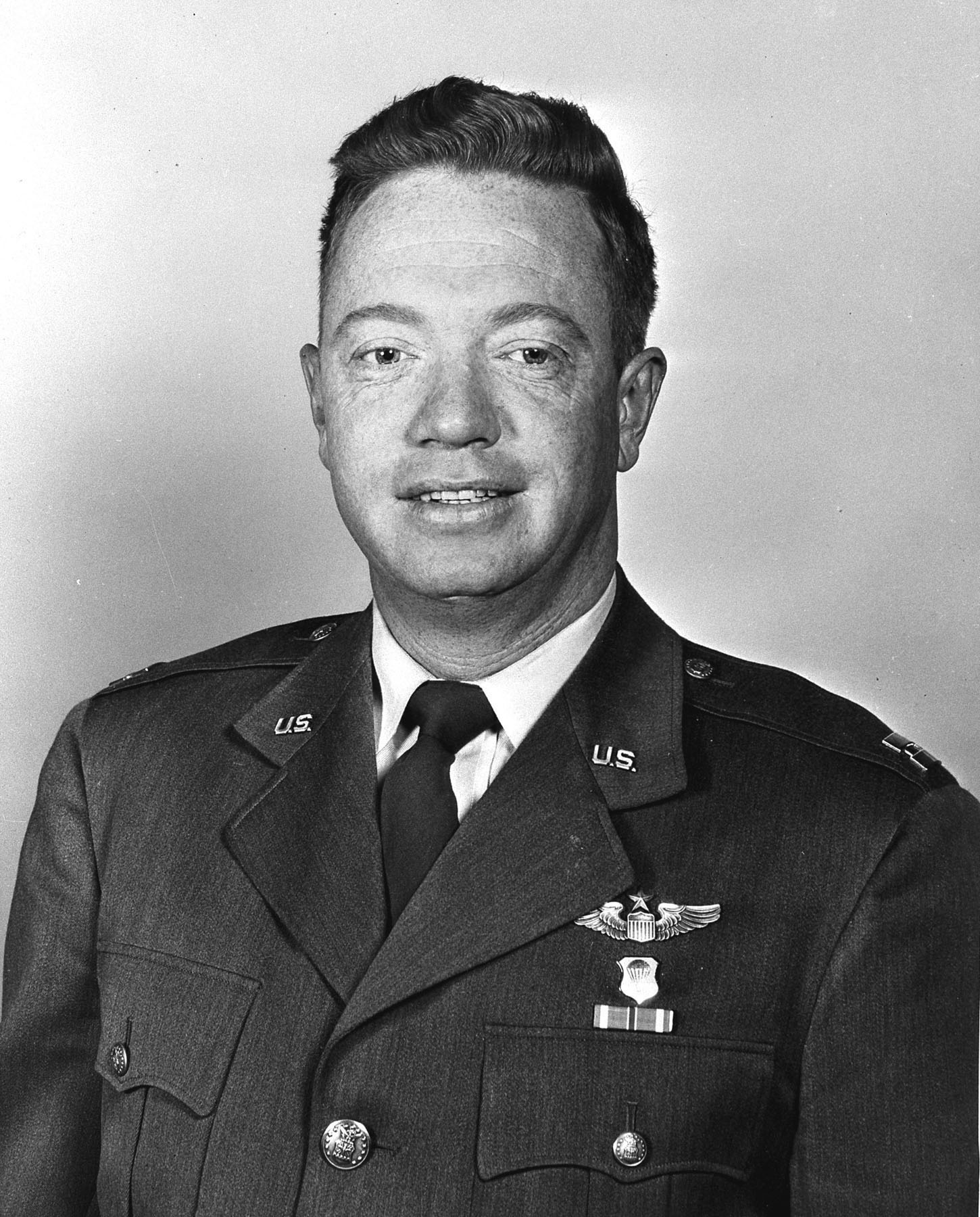
Joseph Kittinger

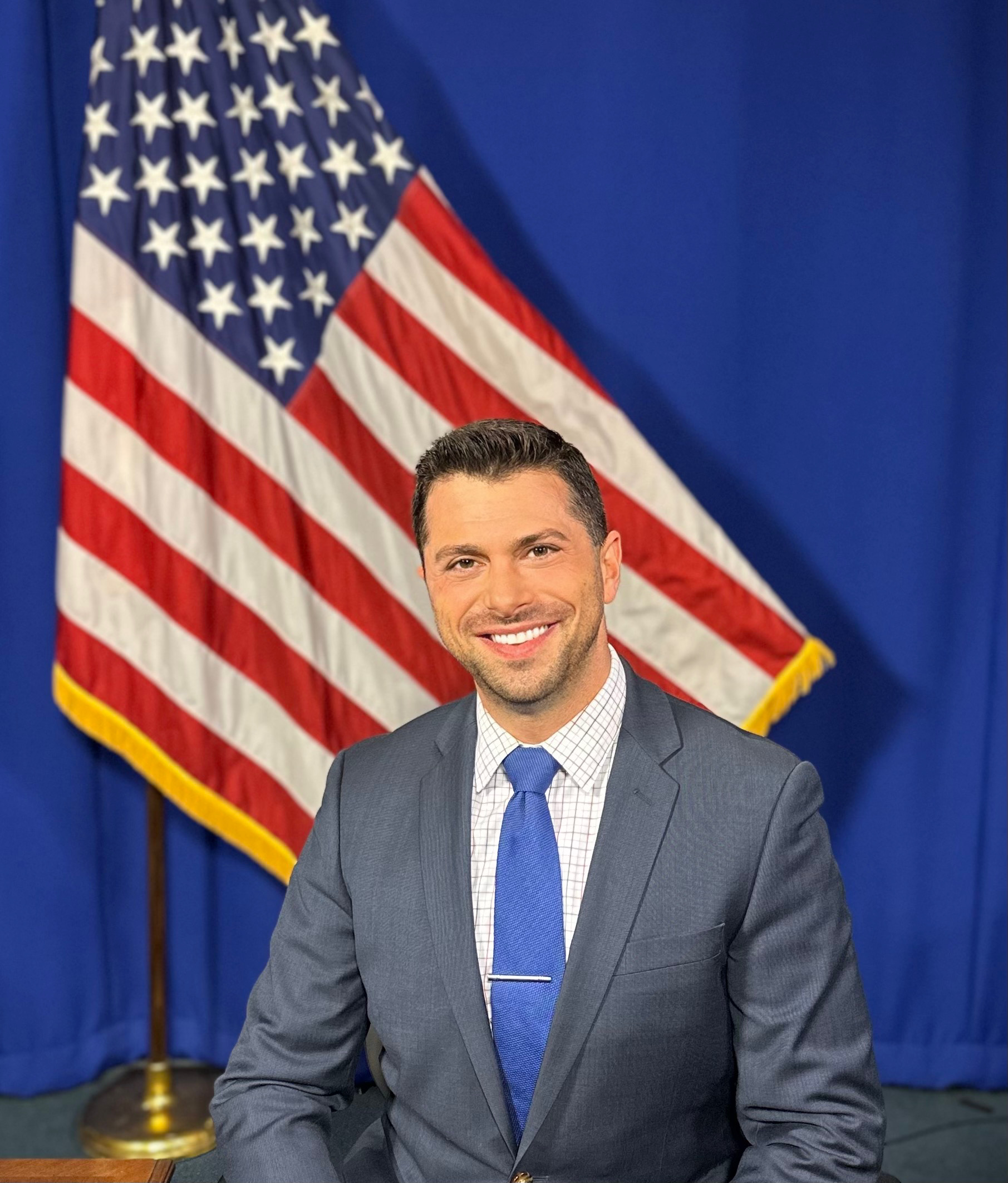
Jonathan Lovitz

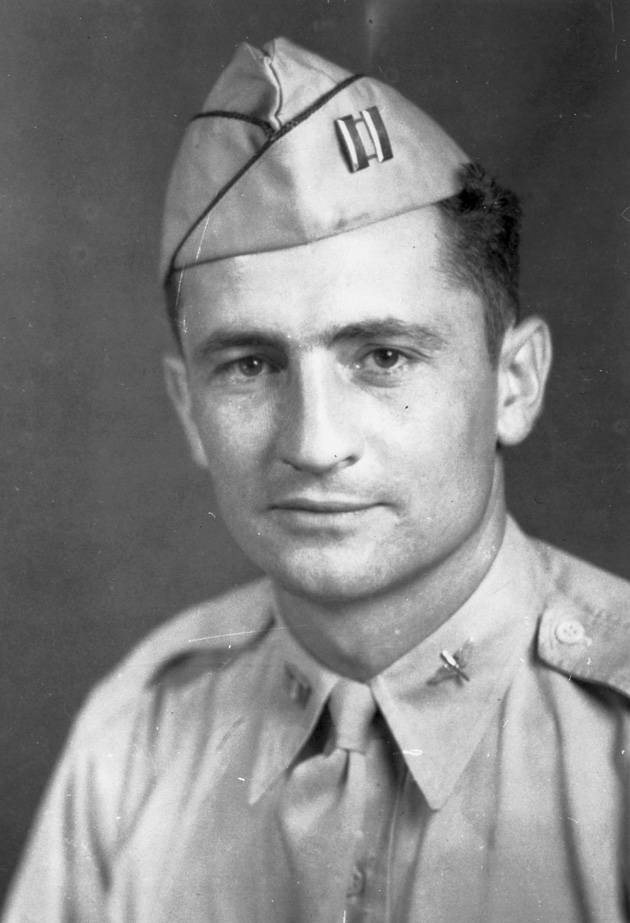
Stephen C. O'Connell

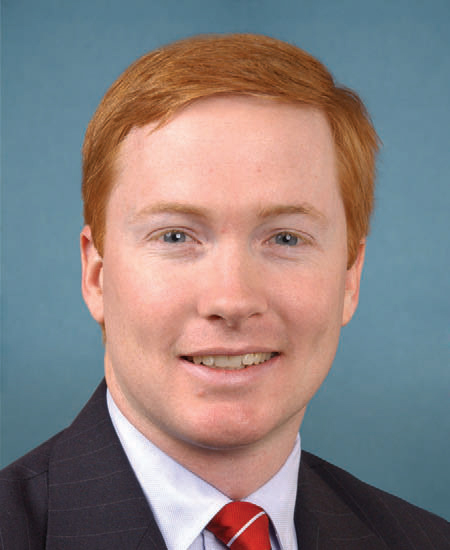
Adam Putnam

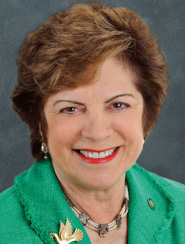
Nan Rich

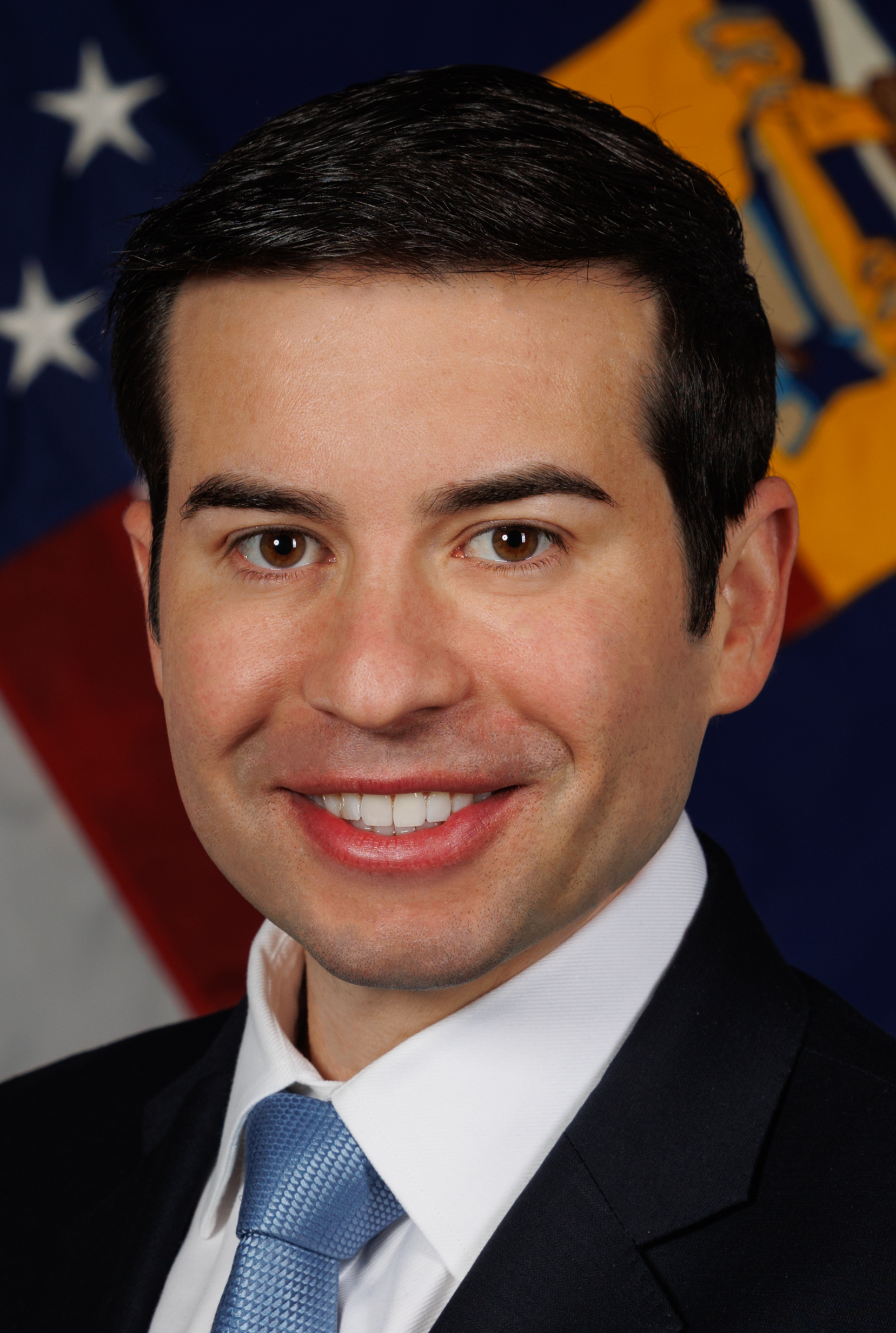
Keith Sonderling

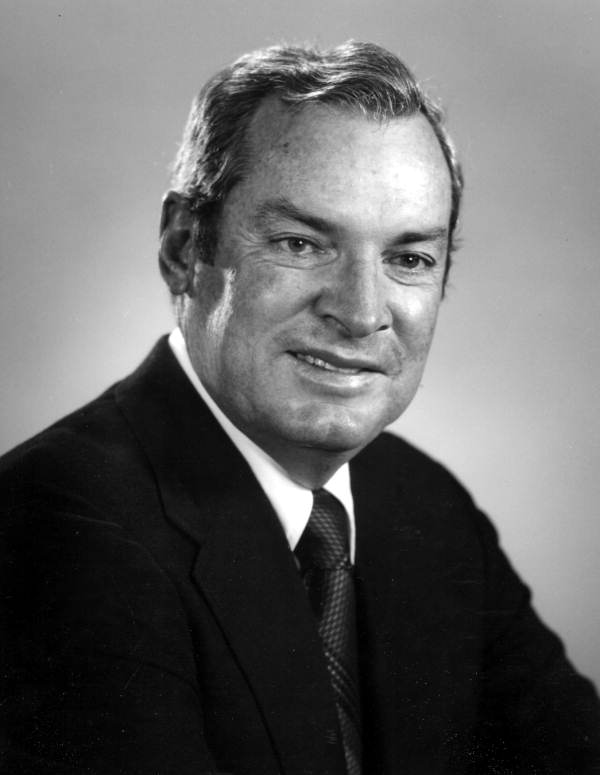
Jim Williams

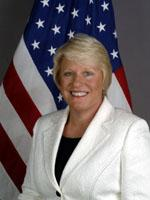
Dr. Barbara Stephenson

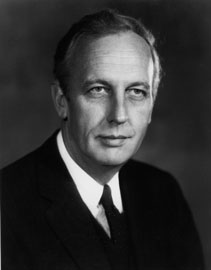
Lucius Battle

- Alto Adams, former justice of the Florida Supreme Court
- Philip Agee, former operative for the Central Intelligence Agency
- J. D. Alexander, former member of the Florida Senate
- John R. Alison, the father of U.S. Air Force special operations
- Chester R. Allen, major general in the Marine Corps and former Quartermaster General
- Pedro Allende, Under Secretary for Science & Technology at the Department of Homeland Security
- William C. Andrews, former member of the Florida House of Representatives
- Harry Lee Anstead, former justice of the Florida Supreme Court
- Winston Arnow, judge who presided over the Gainesville Eight trial
- Jeffrey Atwater, former Chief Financial Officer of Florida and former president of the Florida Senate
- Byllye Avery, health care activist
- Doug Band, chief advisor to former president Bill Clinton; created the Clinton Global Initiative; founding partner of Teneo, a global consulting firm
- Dempsey Barron, former president of the Florida Senate
- Charles R. Black Jr., lobbyist; adviser to President Ronald Reagan
- Dick Black, current member of the Virginia Senate
- Ellyn Bogdanoff, current member of the Florida Senate
- John F. Bolt, lieutenant colonel, United States Marine Corps, naval aviator, Navy Cross recipient
- Pam Bondi, former Attorney General of the United States and former attorney general of Florida
- Rob Bradley, current member of the Florida Senate
- Bob Butterworth, former Florida attorney general, dean of St. Thomas University College of Law
- Scott Camil, political activist, known primarily for leading the Gainesville Eight
- John F. Campbell, current president pro tempore of the Vermont State Senate
- Skip Campbell, former member of the Florida Senate, ran unsuccessfully for Florida attorney general, professor at Nova Southeastern University
- Dean Cannon, former Speaker of the Florida House of Representatives
- Bernadette Castro, former Commissioner of Parks, Recreation, and Historic Preservation for the State of New York
- Agripino Cawich, former member of the Belize House of Representatives
- Leonard F. Chapman Jr., general, United States Marine Corps, 24th Commandant of the Marine Corps
- Mack Cleveland, former member of the Florida Senate
- Doyle Conner, former Florida commissioner of agriculture, and former speaker of the Florida House of Representatives
- C. Welborn Daniel, former member of the Florida Senate
- Louis de la Parte, former president of the Florida Senate
- R. Earl Dixon, former member of the Florida House of Representatives
- Paula Dockery, former member of the Florida Senate and current Majority Whip
- Stan Dromisky, former member of the House of Commons of Canada, current professor and a director of the Thunder Bay Art Gallery
- Raymond Ehrlich, former justice of the Florida Supreme Court
- Richard Ervin, former Florida attorney general
- Earl Faircloth, former Florida attorney general
- Marc Feinstein, minority whip of the South Dakota House of Representatives
- Steven W. Fisher, former judge for the New York Supreme Court
- Anitere Flores, current member of the Florida Senate
- Nikki Fried, current commissioner of the Florida Department of Agriculture
- Jamal Sowell, current CEO and president of Enterprise Florida and the Florida Secretary of Commerce
- Dane Eagle, current executive director of the Florida Department of Economic Opportunity and former member of the Florida House of Representatives
- Lou Frost, public defender in Jacksonville for 36 years
- Charles Gambaro, politician and U.S. Army member
- Piti Gándara, member of the House of Representatives of Puerto Rico
- Jason Gonzalez, former General Counsel to the governor of Florida
- George Greer, circuit court judge who presided over the Terri Schiavo case, he serves in the Pinellas-Pasco County Circuit Court
- Stephen H. Grimes, former justice of the Florida Supreme Court
- Ralph Haben, former Speaker of the Florida House of Representatives and lobbyist
- Mattox Hair, former member of the Florida Senate
- Dorsey B. Hardeman, former member of both houses of the Texas State Legislature and former mayor of San Angelo
- Stuart A. Herrington, author and retired counterintelligence officer with the United States Army
- Bertram Herlong, former bishop of the Episcopal Diocese of Tennessee
- Mallory Horne, former president of the Florida Senate, former speaker of the Florida House of Representatives
- Bruce Jacob, former assistant attorney general of Florida, and prosecuted in Gideon v. Wainwright
- Joe Jacquot, former deputy attorney general of the state of Florida
- Adam M. Jarchow, current member of the Wisconsin State Assembly
- Frederick B. Karl, former justice of the Florida Supreme Court and former member of the Florida Senate
- Mitchell Kaye, member of the Georgia House of Representatives
- Larry Kirkwood, former member of the Florida House of Representatives
- Joseph Kittinger, colonel, U.S. Air Force; USAF fighter pilot known for his high-altitude balloon flights and parachute jumps
- Jeff Kottkamp, former Florida lieutenant governor
- James W. Kynes, former Florida attorney general, former vice president of the Jim Walter Corporation
- Jorge Labarga, current justice of the Florida Supreme Court
- Howell Lancaster, former member of the Florida House of Representatives
- Lewis Landes, former U.S. Army colonel and prominent attorney
- Row Lewis, Grenadian activist
- Jonathan Lovitz, Biden Administration Appointee to Department of Commerce, national LGBTQ advocate
- Evelyn J. Lynn, current member of the Florida Senate
- Scott Makar, former Florida solicitor general
- Ray Mattox, former member of the Florida House of Representatives
- Parker Lee McDonald, former justice of the Florida Supreme Court
- Virginia Montes, Latina civil rights activist and feminist
- Ashley Moody, current U.S. senator from Florida, former Florida attorney general, Florida Thirteenth Judicial Circuit Court judge
- Marcela Mulholland, political director of Data for Progress
- Stephen C. O'Connell, former justice of the Florida Supreme Court and president of the University of Florida
- Ben F. Overton, former justice of the Florida Supreme Court
- Andrew Owens, former Gators basketball player and current circuit Court judge
- Obie Patterson, current member of the Maryland House of Delegates
- Robert C. Pittman, awarded the Distinguished Flying Cross
- Verle Pope, former president of the Florida Senate
- Edgar Price, former member of the Florida Senate
- Adam Putnam, former member of the U.S. House of Representatives, former Florida commissioner of agriculture
- Don Reed, former of the Florida House of Representatives
- Nan Rich, current member of the Florida Senate
- Jose Rodriguez, 31-year veteran of the Central Intelligence Agency, where he served as the director of the National Clandestine Service
- Richard Sealy, Barbadian tourism minister
- Harold Sebring, judge at the Nuremberg Trials, former justice of the Florida Supreme Court
- T. Terrell Sessums, former speaker of the House of Representatives for Florida, former chairman of the Florida Board of Regents
- William A. Shands, former member of the Florida Senate and namesake of the Shands Hospital
- Jeannett Slesnick, former Coral Gables Commissioner, former First Lady of Coral Gables, past candidate for mayor of Coral Gables, community advocate and philanthropist, past chair of various boards
- Bruce Smathers, former Florida secretary of state
- Terry Smiljanich, counsel to the U.S. Senate during the Congressional hearing on the Iran-Contra Affair
- Rod Smith, former member of the Florida Senate, successfully prosecuted Danny Rolling, ran unsuccessfully for governor of Florida
- Keith Sonderling, Acting United States secretary of labor, United States deputy secretary of labor; former commissioner of the U.S. Equal Employment Opportunity Commission
- Susan Stanton, former city manager of Largo, Florida, and transsexual activist
- Douglas Stenstrom, former member of the Florida Senate
- Mac Stipanovich, Republican lobbyist and political consultant who had a large role in the 2000 Florida Recount
- Evelyn L. Stratton, current justice of the Ohio Supreme Court
- William Glenn Terrell, former justice of the Florida Supreme Court
- Tommy Thompson, current member of the Kentucky House of Representatives
- B. Campbell Thornal, former justice of the Florida Supreme Court
- Ralph Turlington, former speaker of the Florida House of Representatives
- W. Fred Turner, successful attorney in the landmark U.S. Supreme Court case Gideon v. Wainwright
- Tom Warner, former Florida solicitor general and former member of the Florida House of Representatives
- Charles T. Wells, former justice of the Florida Supreme Court
- Lezlee Westine, former assistant to the president for Public Liaison in the Bush Administration
- Jim Williams, former deputy secretary of the U.S. Department of Agriculture, and former Florida lieutenant governor
- Charles F. Willis, distinguished naval aviator who served as an aide to U.S. President Dwight D. Eisenhower

=== United States ambassadors ===
- Frank Almaguer, former U.S. ambassador to Honduras
- Lucius D. Battle, former U.S. ambassador to Egypt, former president of the Middle Eastern Institute
- Carey Cavanaugh, former U.S. ambassador, current director of Patterson School of Diplomacy
- Stanley Tuemler Escudero, former U.S. ambassador to Tajikistan, Uzbekistan and Azerbaijan
- Dennis K. Hays, former U.S. ambassador to Suriname
- Barbara J. Stephenson, former U.S. ambassador to Panama and current United States minister to the United Kingdom
- Donald L. Tucker, former U.S. ambassador to the Dominican Republic, former speaker of the Florida House of Representatives
- A. Vernon Weaver, former U.S. ambassador to the European Union

=== United States senators ===
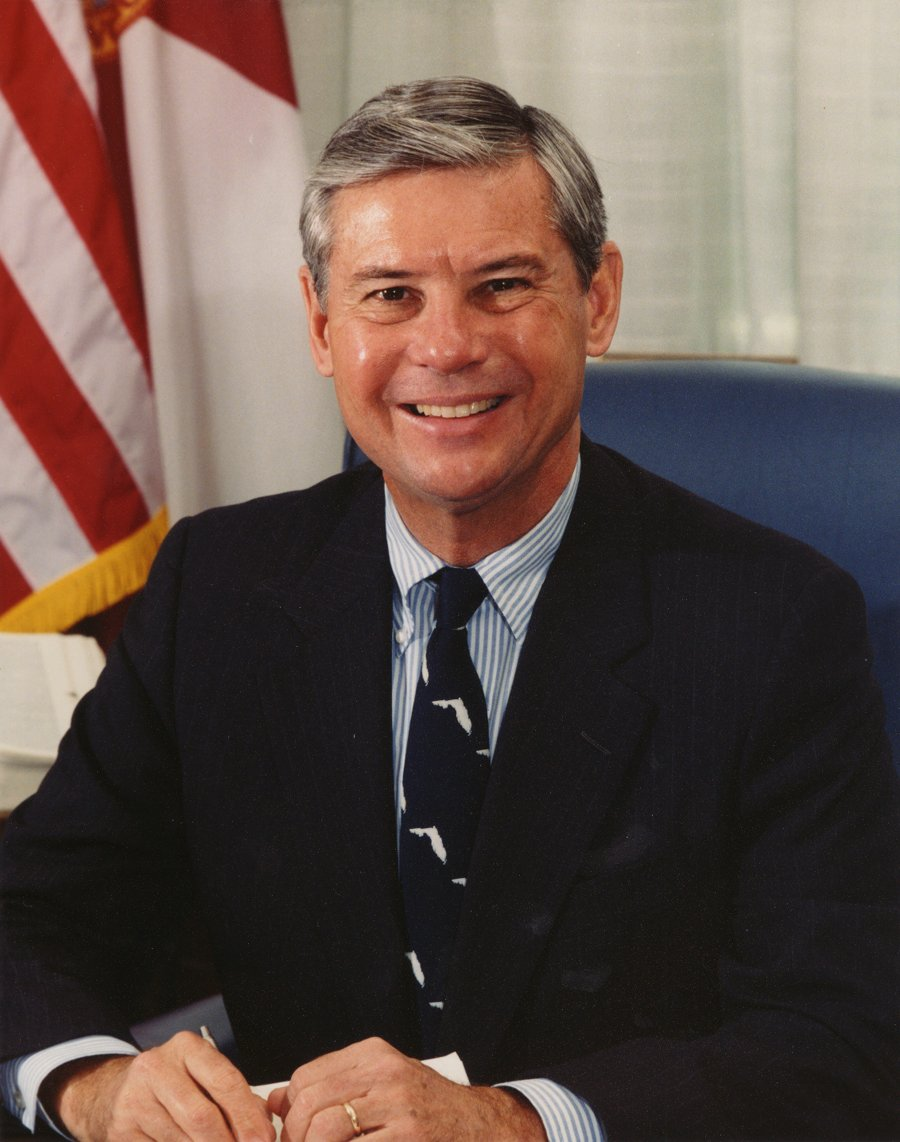
Bob Graham

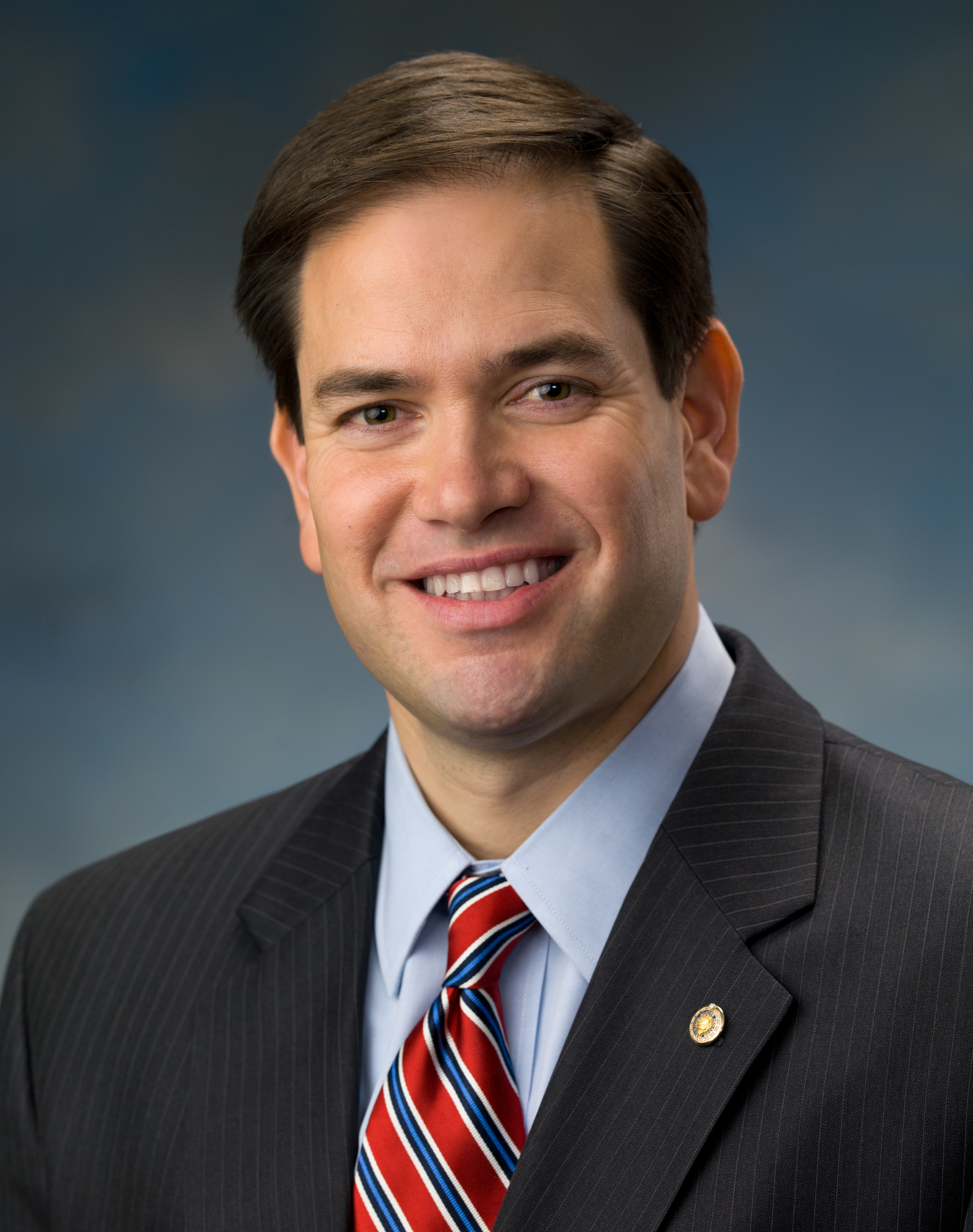
Marco Rubio

- Charles O. Andrews, former U.S. senator
- Lawton Chiles, former U.S. senator and Florida governor
- John Porter East, former U.S. senator (North Carolina)
- Bob Graham, former U.S. senator, Florida governor, and U.S. presidential candidate
- William Luther Hill, former U.S. senator
- Spessard Holland, former U.S. senator and Florida governor, founder of Holland & Knight
- Connie Mack III, former U.S. senator and U.S. representative
- Bill Nelson, former U.S. senator and U.S. representative
- Marco Rubio, current United States Secretary of State, former U.S. senator, and former speaker of the Florida House of Representatives
- George A. Smathers, former U.S. senator, U.S. representative, and benefactor of the George A. Smathers Libraries at the University of Florida

=== Federal judges ===
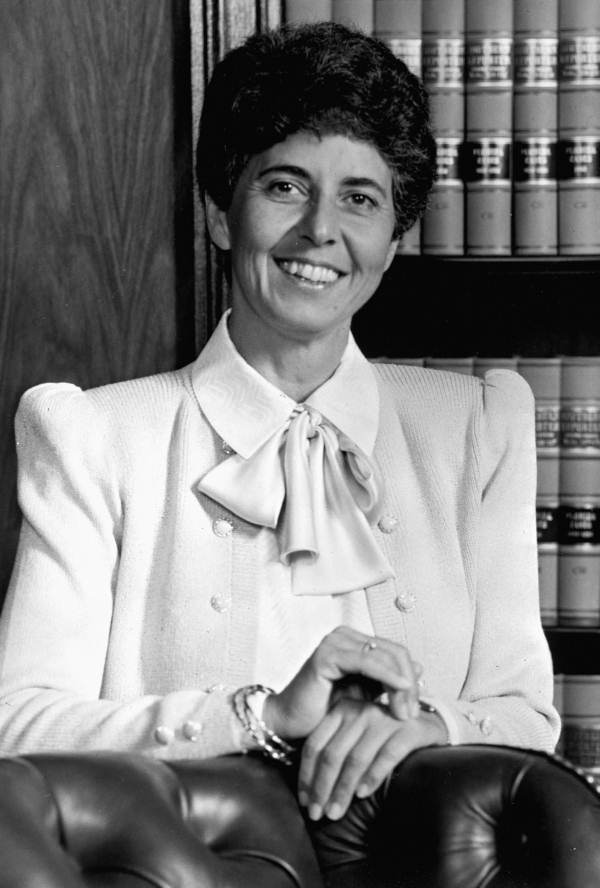
Rosemary Barkett

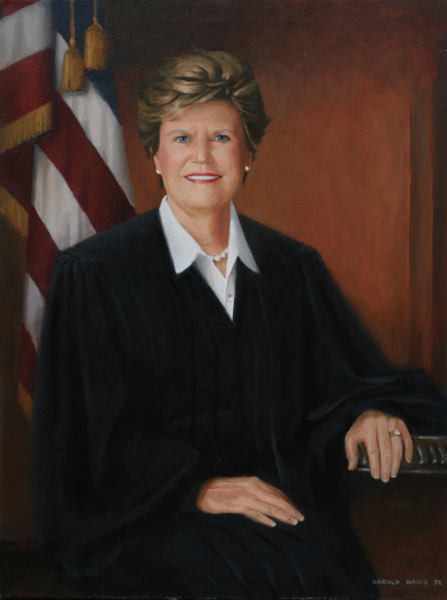
Susan Black

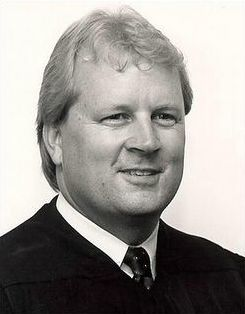
James Whittemore

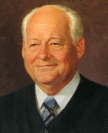
George Young

- Sidney Aronovitz, former judge for the U.S. District Court (Southern District of Florida)
- C. Clyde Atkins, former judge for the U.S. District Court (Southern District of Florida)
- William J. Barker, former judge for the U.S. District Court (Southern District of Florida)
- Rosemary Barkett, current judge for the U.S. Court of Appeals (Eleventh Circuit), former justice of the Florida Supreme Court
- Susan H. Black, current judge for the U.S. Court of Appeals (Eleventh Circuit), former judge for the U.S. District Court (Middle District of Florida)
- Beth Bloom, current judge for the U.S. District Court (Southern District of Florida)
- William J. Castagna, current senior judge for the U.S. District Court (Middle District of Florida)
- Anne C. Conway, current chief judge for the U.S. District Court (Middle District of Florida)
- Roy B. Dalton Jr., current judge for the U.S. District Court (Middle District of Florida)
- Brian J. Davis, current judge for the U.S. District Court (Middle District of Florida)
- Edward B. Davis, former judge for the U.S. District Court (Southern District of Florida)
- William Dimitrouleas, current judge for the U.S. District Court (Southern District of Florida)
- Joe Oscar Eaton, former judge for the U.S. District Court (Southern District of Florida)
- Patricia C. Fawsett, current senior judge for the U.S. District Court (Middle District of Florida)
- Peter T. Fay, current senior judge for the U.S. Court of Appeals (Eleventh Circuit), former judge for the U.S. District Court (Southern District of Florida)
- Charles B. Fulton, former chief judge of the U.S. District Court (Southern District of Florida), 1966–1977
- Alan Stephen Gold, current judge for the U.S. District Court (Southern District of Florida)
- William Terrell Hodges, current senior judge for the U.S. District Court (Middle District of Florida)
- Charlene Honeywell, current judge for the U.S. District Court (Middle District of Florida)
- Marcia Morales Howard, current judge for the U.S. District Court (Southern District of Florida)
- Paul Huck, current senior judge for the U.S. District Court (Southern District of Florida)
- Elizabeth Jenkins, current U.S. magistrate judge (Middle District of Florida)
- James W. Kehoe, former judge for the U.S. Court of Appeals (Eleventh Circuit), and U.S. District Court (Southern District of Florida)
- James Lawrence King, current senior judge for the U.S. District Court (Southern District of Florida)
- Ben Krentzman, former judge for the U.S. District Court (Southern District of Florida)
- Richard A. Lazzara, current judge for the U.S. District Court (Middle District of Florida)
- William McRae, former judge for the U.S. District Court (Southern District of Florida; Middle District of Florida)
- William O. Mehrtens, former judge for the U.S. District Court (Southern District of Florida)
- Howell W. Melton, current judge for the U.S. District Court (Middle District of Florida)
- Steven D. Merryday, current judge for the U.S. District Court (Middle District of Florida)
- Stephan P. Mickle, current judge for the U.S. District Court (Northern District of Florida)
- David L. Middlebrooks, former judge for the U.S. District Court (Northern District of Florida)
- Donald M. Middlebrooks, current judge for the U.S. District Court (Southern District of Florida)
- Kathryn Kimball Mizelle, current judge for the U.S. District Court (Middle District of Florida)
- James S. Moody Jr., current judge for the U.S. District Court (Middle District of Florida)
- Ralph Wilson Nimmons Jr., former judge for the U.S. District Court (Middle District of Florida)
- James Carriger Paine, current senior judge for the U.S. District Court (Southern District of Florida)
- Maurice M. Paul, current senior judge for the U.S. District Court (Northern District of Florida)
- S. Jay Plager, current judge for the U.S. Court of Appeals (Federal Circuit)
- Gregory A. Presnell, current judge for the U.S. District Court (Middle District of Florida)
- John M. Bryan Simpson, former judge for the U.S. Court of Appeals (Fifth Circuit), and U.S. District Court (Southern District of Florida)
- John Richard Smoak Jr., current judge for the U.S. District Court (Northern District of Florida)
- Eugene P. Spellman, former judge for the U.S. District Court (Southern District of Florida)
- Jose Victor Toledo, former judge for (United States District Court for the District of Puerto Rico)
- Ursula Mancusi Ungaro, current judge for the U.S. District Court (Southern District of Florida)
- Mark E. Walker, current judge for the U.S. District Court (Northern District of Florida)
- George Whitehurst, former judge for the U.S. District Court (Northern and Southern Districts of Florida)
- James Whittemore, current judge for the U.S. District Court (Middle District of Florida)
- George C. Young, former judge for the U.S. District Court (Northern, Middle and Southern Districts of Florida)

=== United States representatives ===
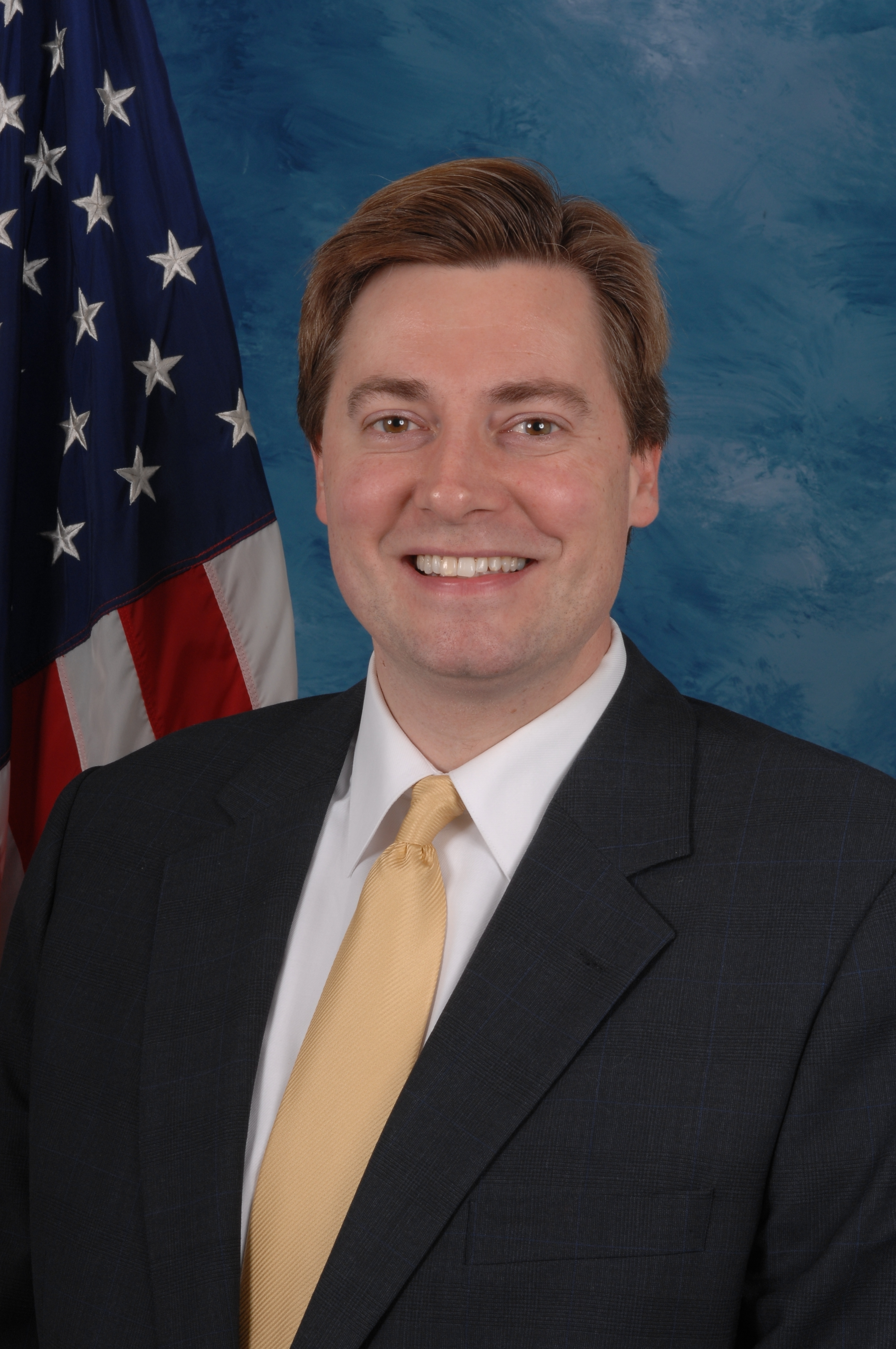
Jason Altmire

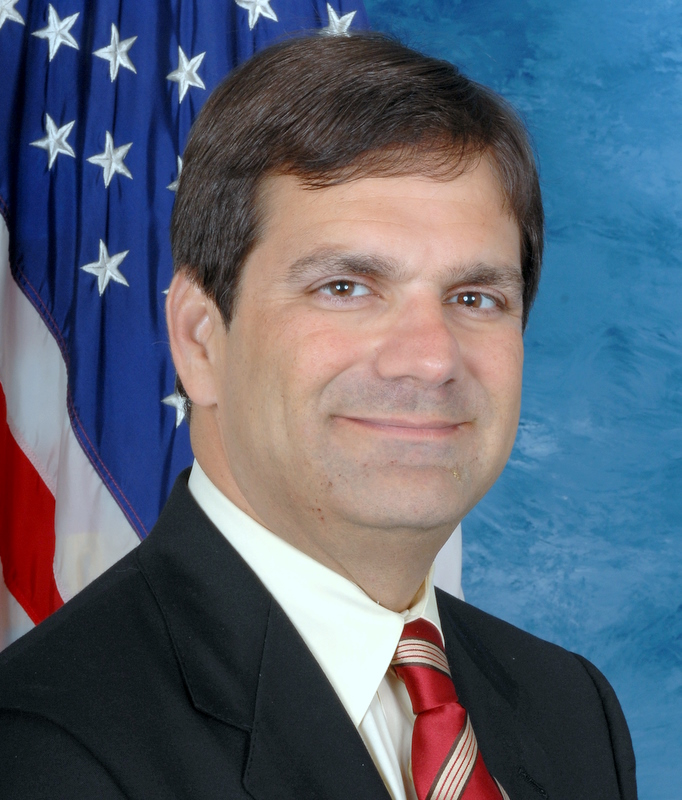
Gus Bilirakis

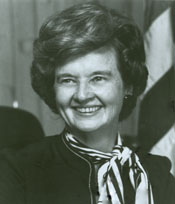
Marjorie Holt

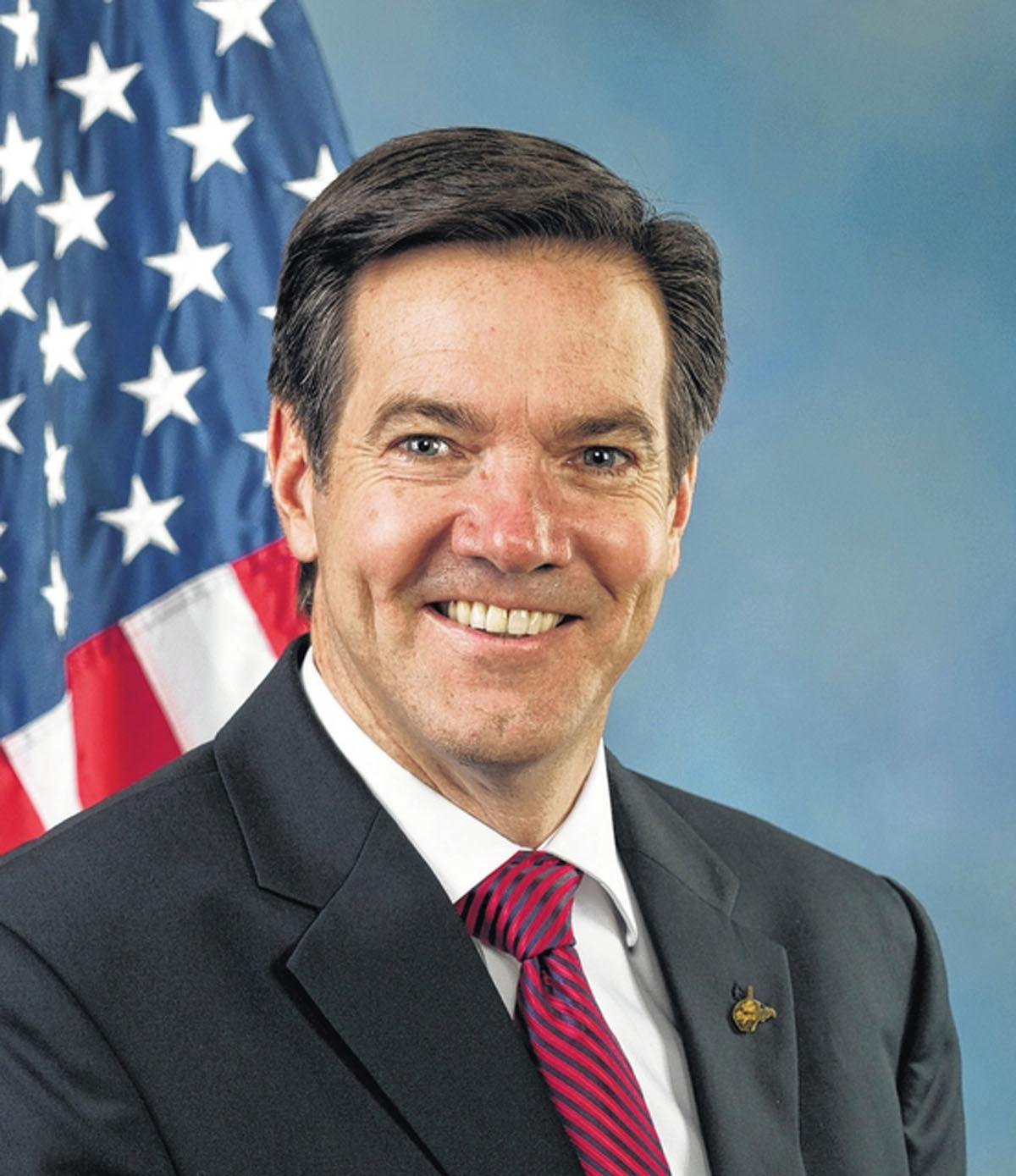
Evan Jenkins

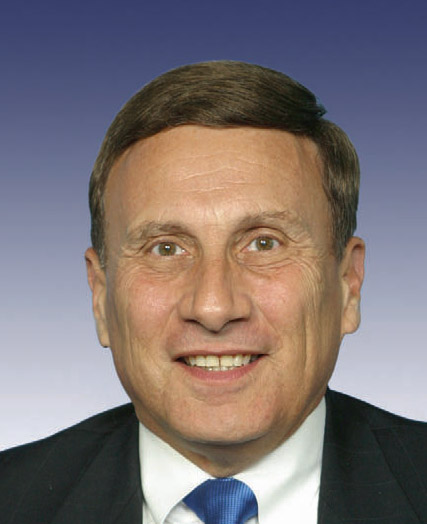
John Mica

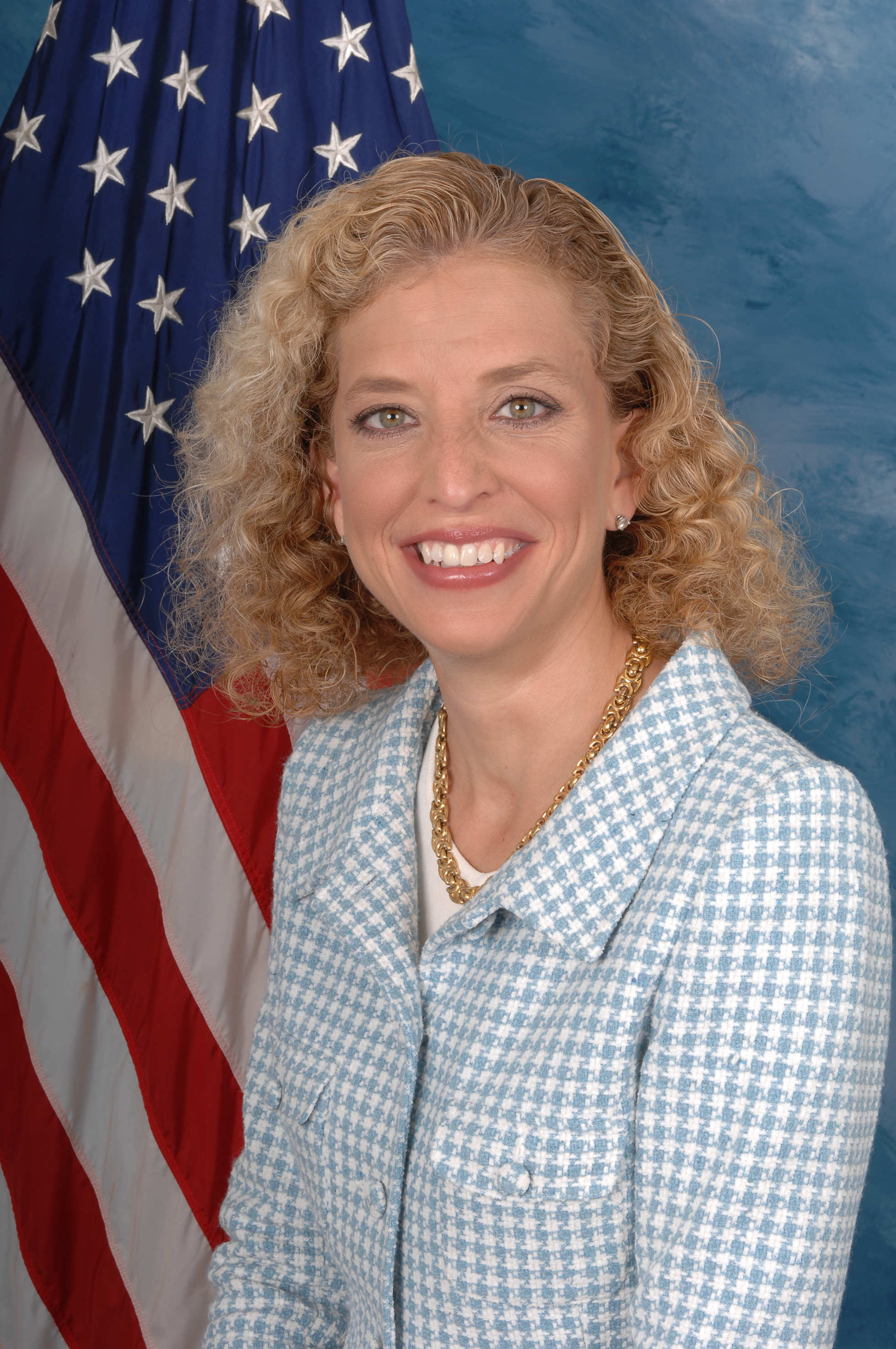
Debbie Wasserman Schultz

- Jason Altmire, former U.S. representative
- Charles Edward Bennett, former U.S. representative
- Gus Bilirakis, current U.S. representative
- Michael Bilirakis, former U.S. representative
- Corrine Brown, former U.S. representative
- William V. Chappell Jr., former U.S. representative
- Ander Crenshaw, former U.S. representative
- Jim Davis, former U.S. representative, ran unsuccessfully for Governor of Florida
- Don Fuqua, former U.S. representative
- Sam Gibbons, former U.S. representative
- Bill Grant, former U.S. representative
- Robert A. Green, former U.S. representative
- Bill Gunter, former U.S. representative
- Syd Herlong, former U.S. representative
- Marjorie Holt, former U.S. representative
- Craig James, former U.S. representative
- Evan Jenkins, former U.S. representative from West Virginia
- Harry Johnston, former U.S. representative
- Bill Lantaff, former U.S. representative
- Tom Lewis, former U.S. representative
- Connie Mack III, former U.S. representative and U.S. Senator
- Connie Mack IV, former U.S. representative
- Buddy MacKay, former U.S. representative
- Betsy Markey, former U.S. representative
- Donald Ray Matthews, former U.S. representative
- Bill McCollum, former U.S. representative and former Florida attorney general
- Chester B. McMullen, former U.S. representative
- Daniel Mica, former U.S. representative
- John Mica, former U.S. representative
- Dan Miller, former U.S. representative
- Jeff Miller, former U.S. representative
- Bill Nelson, former U.S. representative and current U.S. senator
- J. Hardin Peterson, former U.S. representative
- Adam Putnam, former U.S. representative
- Paul G. Rogers, former U.S. representative
- Tom Rooney, former U.S. representative
- Dennis A. Ross, current U.S. representative
- Joe Scarborough, former U.S. representative and current MSNBC talk show host
- Debbie Wasserman Schultz, current U.S. representative
- Bob Sikes, former U.S. representative
- Karen Thurman, former U.S. representative
- Robert Wexler, former U.S. representative
- Ted Yoho, current U.S. representative
- Greg Steube, current U.S. representative

=== Governors ===
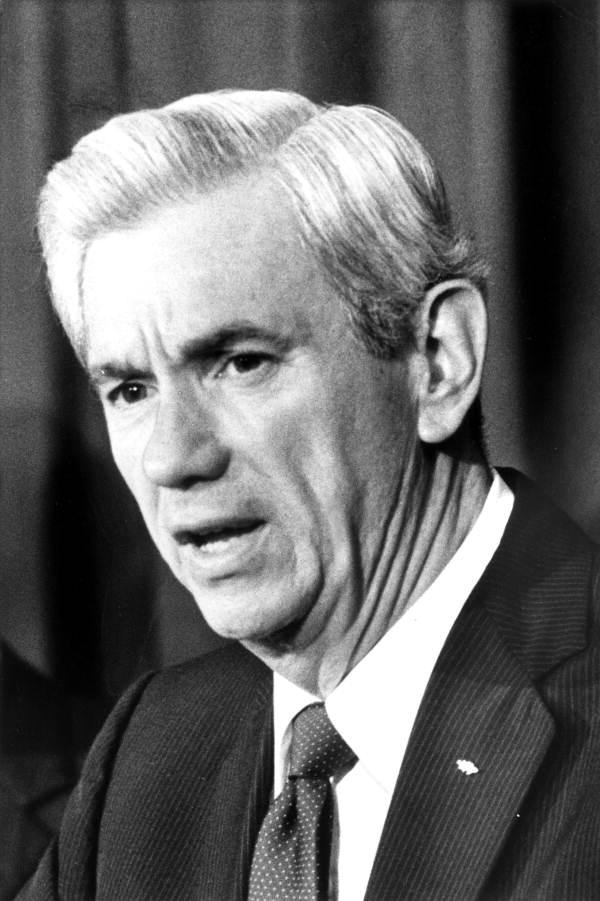
Reubin Askew

- Reubin O'Donovan Askew, former Florida governor
- C. Farris Bryant, former Florida governor
- Lawton Chiles, former Florida governor and U.S. Senator
- Bob Graham, former Florida governor, U.S. senator, and presidential candidate
- Spessard Holland, former Florida governor U.S. senator, and founder of Holland & Knight
- Charley Eugene Johns, former governor
- Buddy MacKay, former Florida governor and Florida lieutenant governor
- Daniel T. McCarty, former Florida governor
- Wayne Mixson, former Florida governor and lieutenant governor
- Beverly Perdue, former North Carolina governor, and former North Carolina lieutenant governor
- Fuller Warren, former Florida governor

=== Mayors ===
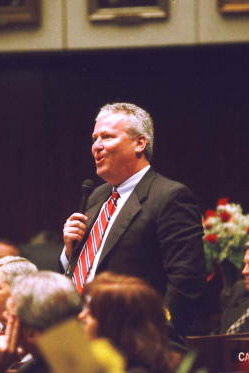
Buddy Dyer

- Ed Austin, former mayor of Jacksonville, Florida
- Lenny Curry, former mayor of Jacksonville, Florida
- John Delaney, former mayor of Jacksonville, Florida
- Buddy Dyer, current mayor of Orlando, Florida
- Randy Ewers, current mayor of Ocala, Florida
- Robert L. Floyd, former mayor of Miami, Florida
- Pegeen Hanrahan, former mayor of Gainesville
- Rick Kriseman, former mayor of St. Petersburg, Florida
- John Land, currently the longest-serving mayor in the history of the State of Florida
- Julian Lane, former mayor of Tampa, Florida
- Craig Lowe, former mayor of Gainesville, Florida
- William F. Poe, former mayor of Tampa, Florida
- Hans Tanzler, former mayor of Jacksonville, Florida

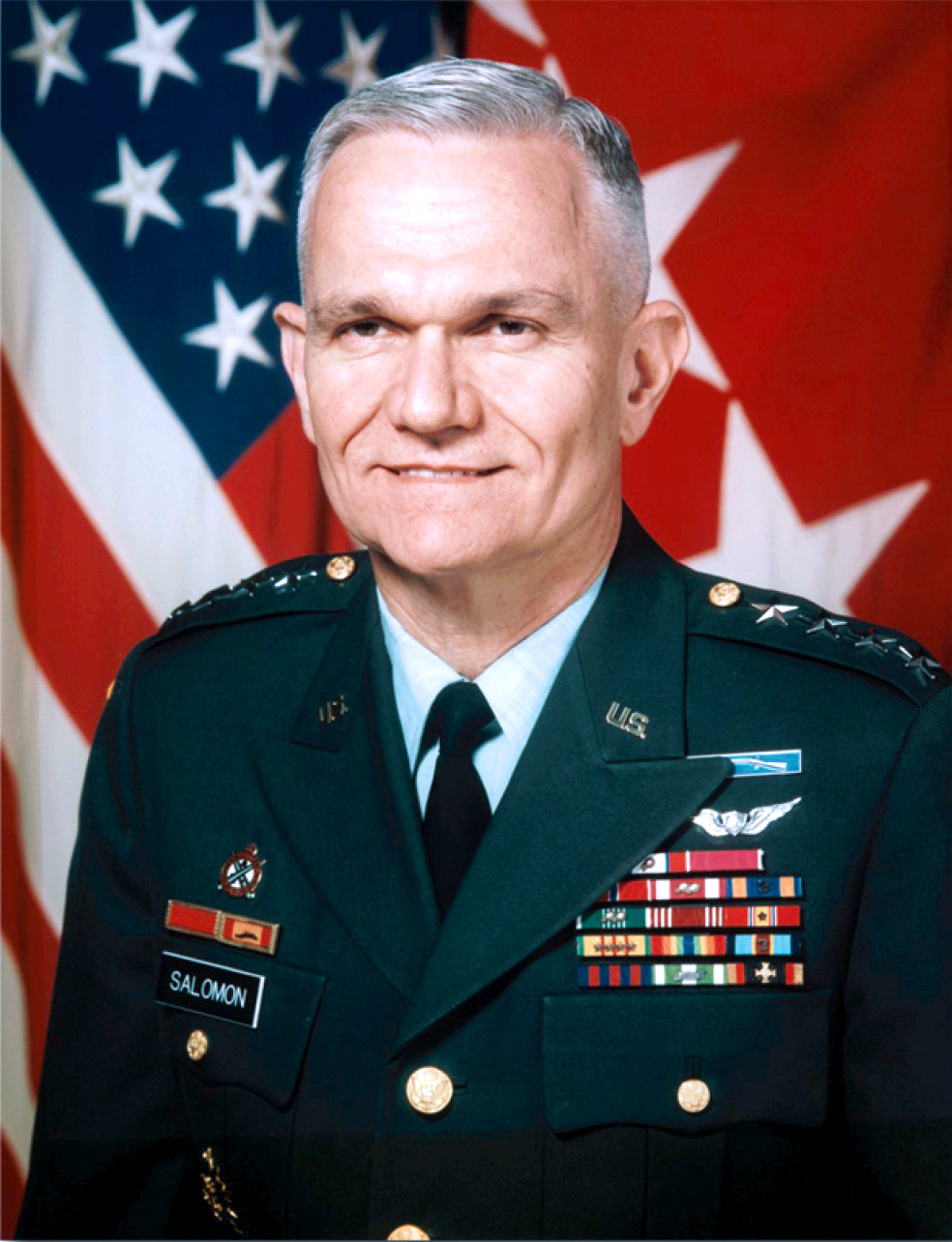
Leon Salomon

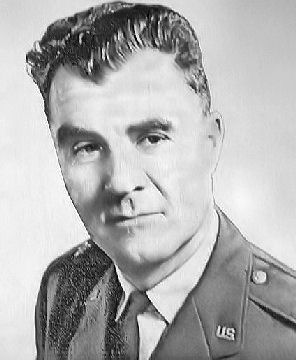
Paul Tibbets

=== Generals and admirals ===
- John R. Alison, retired U.S. Air Force major general, and father of Air Force Special Operations
- George F. Baughman, retired U.S. Navy rear admiral, and founding president of New College of Florida
- Albert H. Blanding, retired U.S. Army lieutenant general
- Richard E. Cellon, active U.S. Navy rear admiral
- Leonard F. Chapman Jr., retired U.S. Marine Corps general, former Commandant of the Marine Corps
- Charles W. Dorman, retired U.S. Marine Corps brigadier general, former chief judge of the U.S. Navy-Marine Corps Court of Criminal Appeals
- Mark T. Emerson, active U.S. Navy rear admiral, current commander of the Naval Strike and Air Warfare Center
- Joseph C. Joyce, retired U.S. Army brigadier general, current vice president of Institute of Food and Agricultural Sciences
- Richard B. Landolt, active U.S. Navy rear admiral
- John M. LeMoyne, retired U.S. Army Lieutenant general
- Leon E. Salomon, retired U.S. Army general, current vice president of Rubbermaid
- Leland C. Shepard, retired U.S. Air Force brigadier general
- Alan S. Thompson, retired U.S. Navy Vice Admiral; former director of U.S. Defense Logistics Agency
- Paul Tibbets, retired U.S. Air Force brigadier general, pilot of the Enola Gay
- Kenneth S. Wilsbach, active U.S. Air Force general

== Business executives, policy leaders and others ==
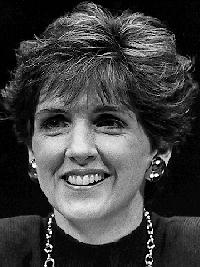
Carol Browner

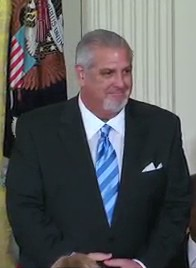
Pedro Greer

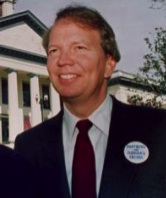
Jon Mills

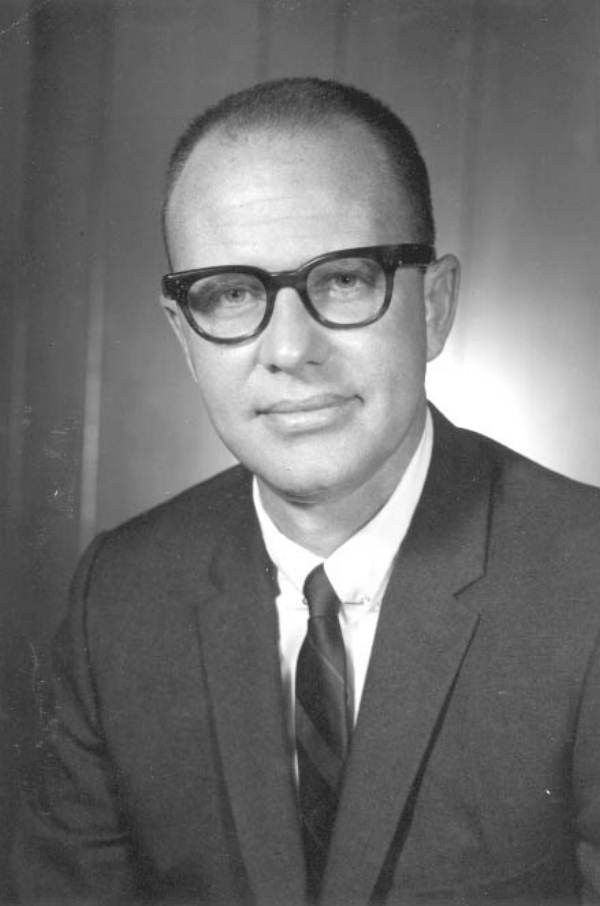
Frederick Schultz

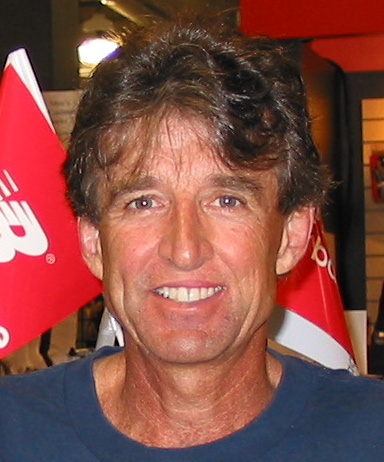
Frank Shorter

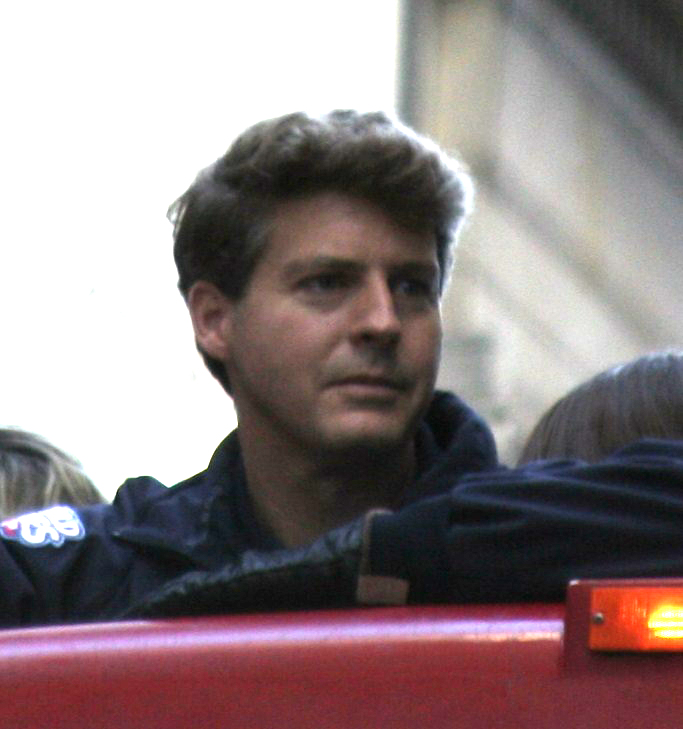
Hal Steinbrenner

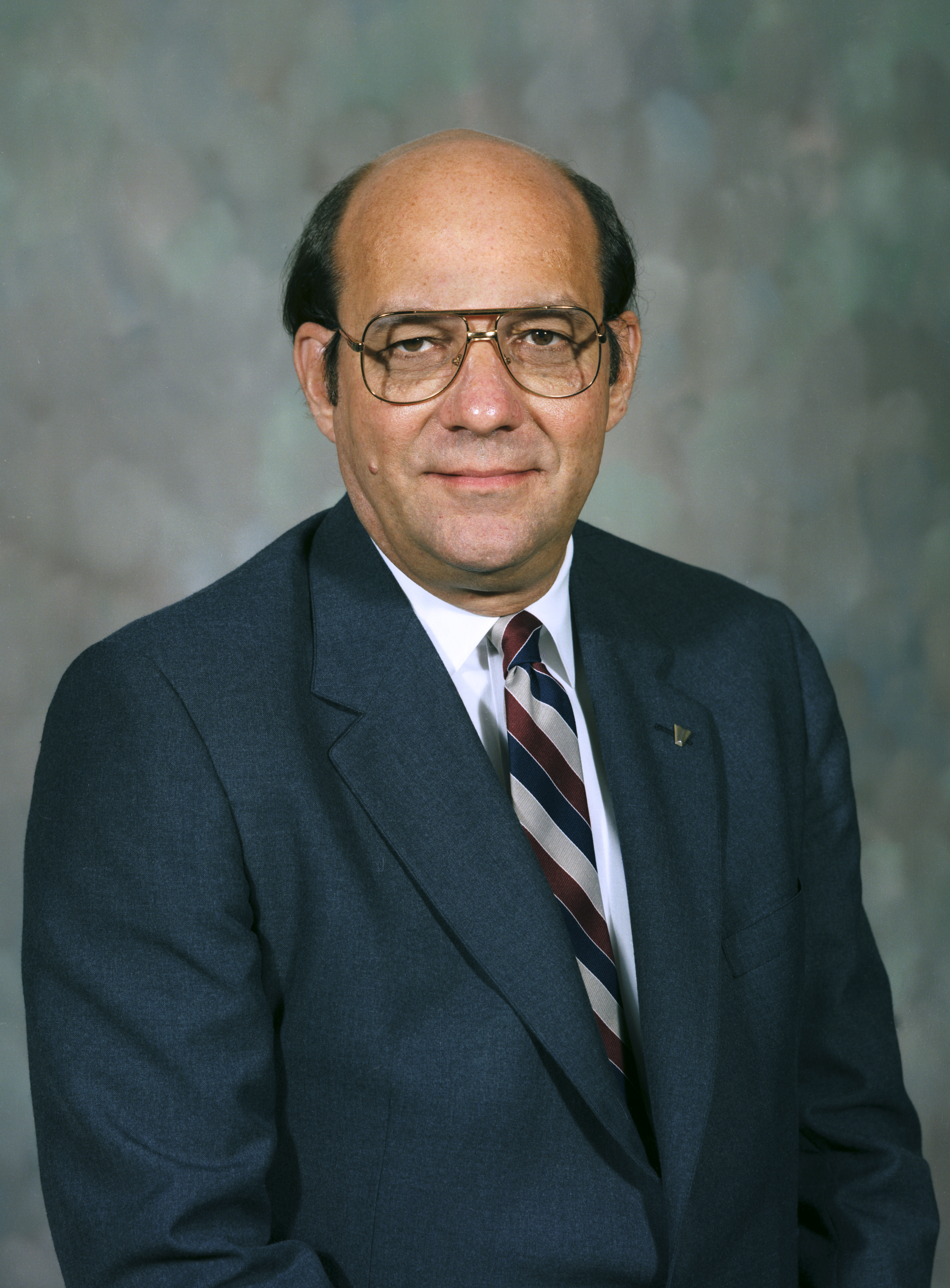
Jim Thompson

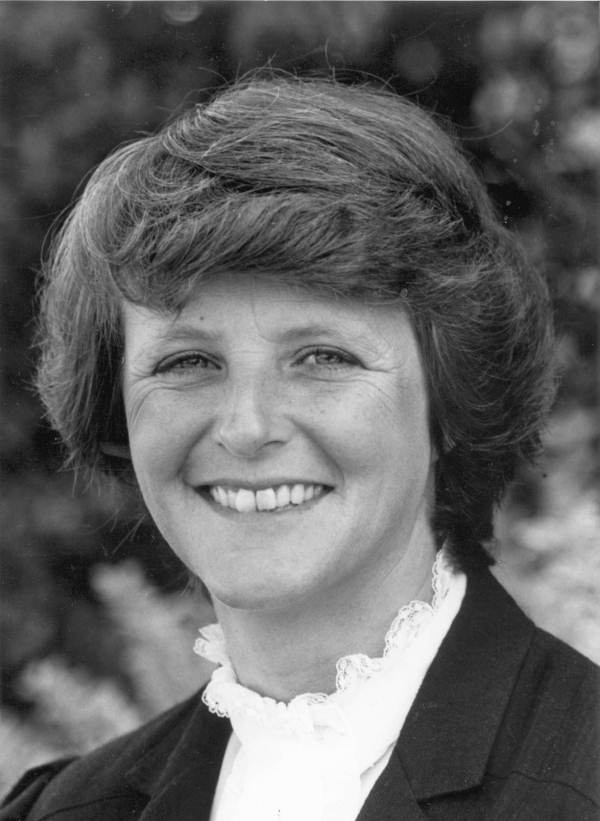
Karen Thurman

Craig Waters

- Khalid bin Mohammed Al Angari, former Minister of Higher Education for the Kingdom of Saudi Arabia
- Raymond W. Alden III, current provost and executive vice president of Northern Illinois University
- A. Paul Anderson, former commissioner of the United States Federal Maritime Commission
- Steve Atkiss, former Chief of Staff at the U.S. Customs and Border Protection and principal with Command Consulting Group
- DuBose Ausley, former chairman of the Florida Board of Regents
- Debra D. Austin, former chancellor of the State University System of Florida
- Thomas E. Baker, founding member of the Florida International University College of Law
- Holly Benson, former secretary of the Florida Department of Business and Professional Regulation
- Alan Stephenson Boyd, former secretary of the United States Department of Transportation
- Robert B. Bradley, current vice president at Florida State University
- David Bryan, bishop in the Anglican Church in North America
- Carol Browner, former director of the White House Office of Energy and Climate Change Policy in the Obama administration and former administrator of the Environmental Protection Agency
- Dana Bullen, former director of the Press Freedom Committee, former foreign editor of The Washington Star
- Kiki Carter, former environmental activist, organizer, songwriter, and columnist
- Robert B. Carter, current CIO of the FedEx Corporation
- Alan Cohen, former owner of the Florida Panthers hockey team
- Abre' Conner, Director of the Center for Environmental and Climate Justice at the NAACP
- John J. Considine, current senior minister for the Unity Church, former member of the Florida House of Representatives
- Marshall Criser, former chairman of Scripps Florida, and former president of the University of Florida
- Marshall Criser III, current chancellor of the State University System of Florida
- J. Broward Culpepper, first chancellor of the State University System of Florida, and former dean at Florida State University
- J.J. Daniel, former publisher of The Florida Times-Union and Jacksonville Journal
- Paul Rand Dixon, former commissioner and chairman of the Federal Trade Commission
- Ngo Dong, founder of Cuong Nhu
- Carl Epting, current bishop for the Episcopal Church
- Mark Erstling, senior vice president and chief operating officer for the Association of Public Television Stations
- Mark S. Fowler, former Federal Communications Commissioner
- Richard Gershon, current dean of the University of Mississippi School of Law
- Pedro José Greer, winner of the Presidential Medal of Freedom, and assistant dean for Florida International University College of Medicine
- Bill Gurley, general partner at Benchmark Capital
- Nikolas Gvosdev, former editor of The National Interest and professor at the Naval War College and Georgetown University
- John Halinski, former Deputy Administrator for the Transportation Security Administration
- Mason Hawkins, founder of Southeastern Asset Management
- Kenneth T. Henson, current dean of education at The Citadel
- Bertram Nelson Herlong, former Episcopal bishop of Tennessee
- Thomas Hill, former vice president at Iowa State University
- Lawrence J. Hoffman, founder of Greenberg Traurig
- Willis N. Holcombe, former chancellor of the Florida College System
- Van Ellis Huff, inventor of the jalousie window
- Carrie Julier, current COO of Orangetheory Fitness
- Steven J. Kachelmeier, current editor of The Accounting Review and professor at The University of Texas at Austin
- Mark E. Kaplan, former secretary of the Florida Department of Transportation
- Jack Katz, founder and chief executive officer of the Panama Jack Company
- Denise Krepp, former chief counsel for U.S. Maritime Administration
- Douglas Leigh, advertising executive, and pioneer in signage and outdoor advertising, and created New York City's Times Square
- Josh Linkner, founder, chief executive officer and executive chairman of ePrize, chief executive officer and general partner of Detroit Venture Partners
- Chris Linn, current vice president of MTV
- Robert Love, software developer who uses open source, known for his contributions to the Linux kernel
- Alan M. Lovelace, former deputy administrator of NASA
- CJ Lyons, physician and writer of medical suspense novels
- Stephen MacNamara, current vice president of Florida State University
- Scott Makar, former Florida solicitor general
- Jack C. Massey, former owner of Kentucky Fried Chicken and founder of Hospital Corporation of America
- Bill McBride, lawyer, former managing partner of Holland & Knight, ran unsuccessfully for Governor of Florida in 2002
- Kip McKean, founder of the International Churches of Christ
- James E. McLean, current dean of education at the University of Alabama
- Howell W. Melton Jr., former managing partner for Holland & Knight
- Jon L. Mills, former dean of the university's Fredric G. Levin College of Law
- Dianna Fuller Morgan, former senior vice president of Walt Disney World, current chairman of the University of Florida Board of Trustees
- John Morgan, founder of Morgan & Morgan nationwide personal injury firm
- Joe Nosef, current chairman of the Mississippi Republican Party
- Esther Olavarria, current deputy assistant secretary for United States Department of Homeland Security
- Karen W. Pane, former assistant secretary for the United States Department of Veterans Affairs
- Wilford B. Poe, current vice president of the Space Systems Group
- William F. Powers, former vice president of research for the Ford Motor Company
- Buzz Ritchie, co-founder of Gulf Coast Community Bank, former member of Florida House of Representatives
- Jose A. Rodriguez Jr., former director of the Central Intelligence Agency's National Clandestine Service
- Howie Roseman, current general manager of the Philadelphia Eagles
- Thane Rosenbaum (born 1960), writer and law professor
- Stephen M. Ross, current owner of the Miami Dolphins
- Scott W. Rothstein, disbarred attorney and convicted felon charged with perpetrating a $1.2 billion Ponzi scheme
- Frederick H. Schultz, former vice chairman of the Federal Reserve System, and former speaker of the Florida House of Representatives
- Frank Shorter, former chairman of the United States Anti-Doping Agency, and Olympic gold medalist
- James F. Sirmons, radio broadcast pioneer and former executive vice president of Industrial Relations at CBS
- Eric J. Smith, former education commissioner of Florida
- Hal Steinbrenner, current executive vice president and general partner for the New York Yankees
- Haywood Sullivan, former owner of the Boston Red Sox
- Melinda Lou Thomas, namesake of Wendy's restaurants and daughter of Wendy's founder Dave Thomas
- James R. Thompson Jr., former director of NASA's Marshall Space Flight Center
- Karen Thurman, former chairwoman of the Florida Democratic Party, and former U.S. representative
- Julie K. Underwood, current dean of the University of Wisconsin-Madison School of Education
- Craig Waters, spokesman for the Florida Supreme Court during the 2000 presidential election controversy
- James L. Wattenbarger, creator of the Florida Community Colleges System
- A. Vernon Weaver, former administrator of the U.S. Small Business Administration
- David P. Weber, former chief investigator of the U.S. Securities and Exchange Commission, and professor at the Perdue School of Business at Salisbury University
- Harry Wismer, founding owner of the New York Titans, which became the New York Jets

=== Presidents and chief executive officers ===
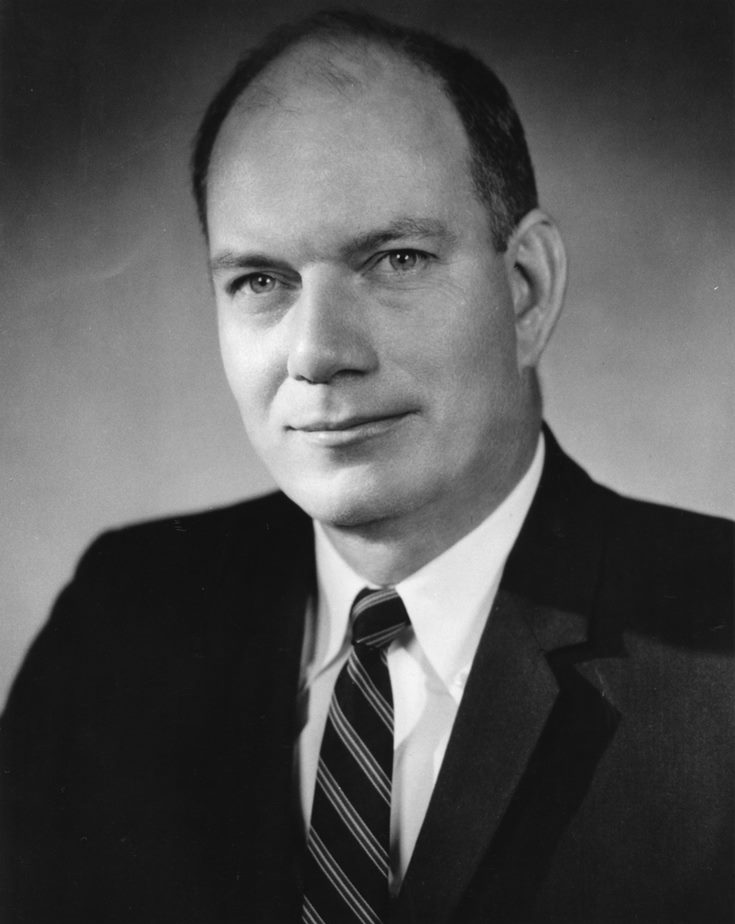
Alan Boyd

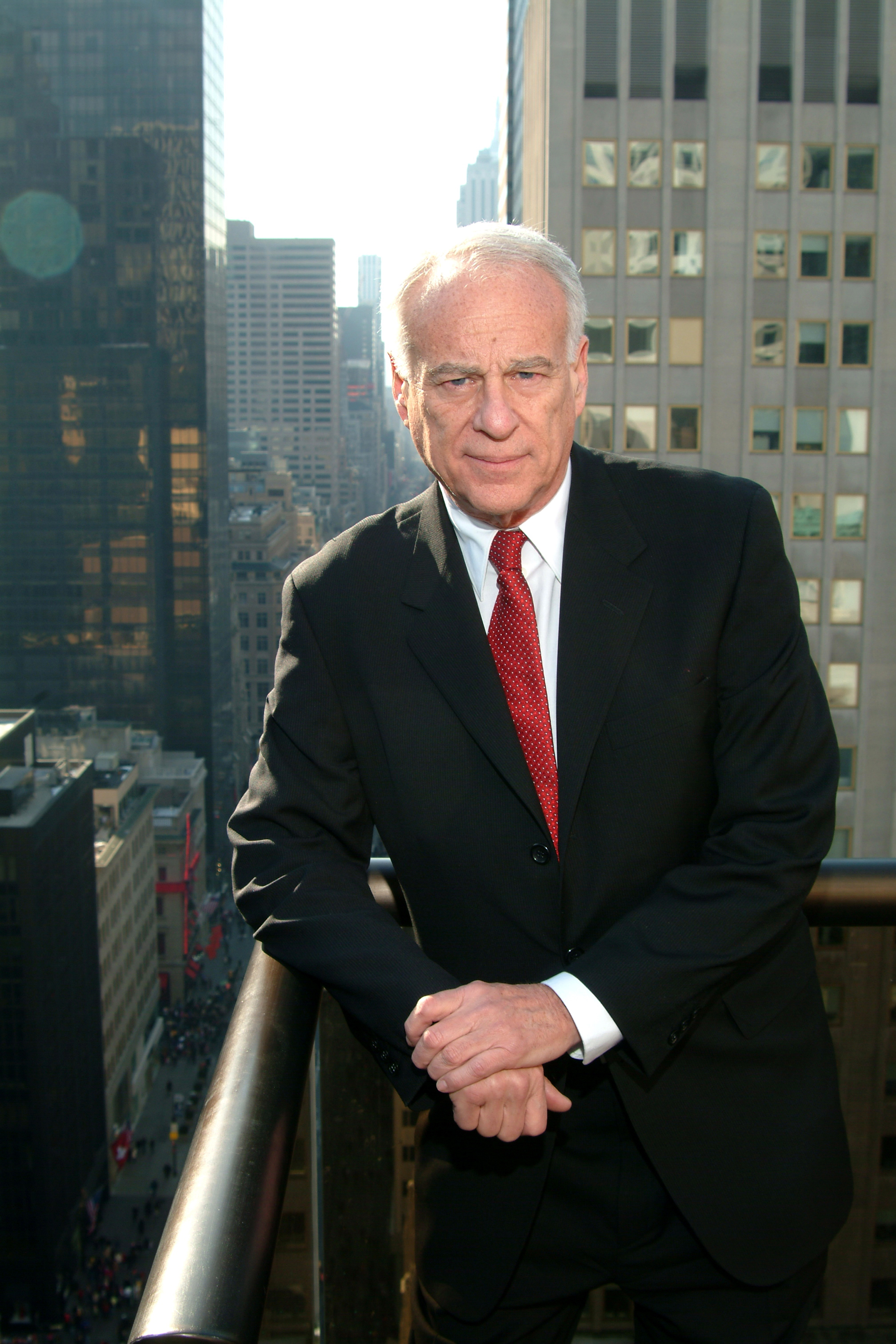
Malcolm Bricklin

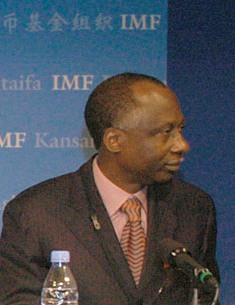
Dr. André-Philippe Futa

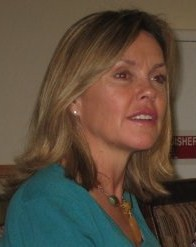
Betsy Markey

Satya Prabhakar

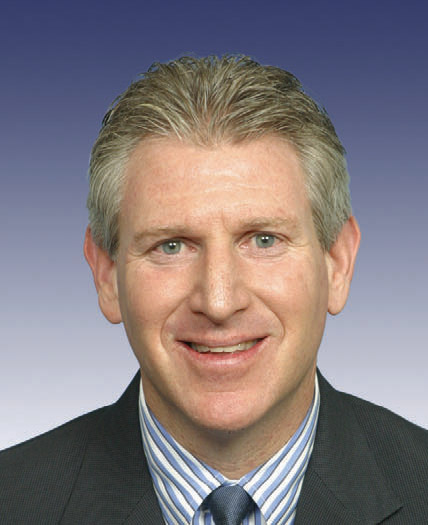
Robert Wexler

- Braulio Alonso, former president of the National Education Association (NEA)
- Martha Barnett, former president of American Bar Association (ABA)
- Edward L. Bowen, current president of Grayson-Jockey Club Research Foundation
- Alan Stephenson Boyd, former president of Amtrak, Airbus, and Illinois Central Railroad
- James W. Bradford (BA 1969), CEO of AFG Industries, 1992–1999, and the United Glass Corporation 1999–2001
- Malcolm Bricklin, former CEO of Subaru of America and creator of the Bricklin SV-1
- Joie Chitwood, current president and chief operating officer of the Indianapolis Motor Speedway
- Robert Cohn, former CEO and founder of Octel Communications
- Gay Culverhouse, former president of the Tampa Bay Buccaneers
- Sandy D'Alemberte, former president the American Bar Association, and Florida State University
- John Dasburg, former CEO of Northwest Airlines, and former chairman of the Burger King Corporation
- Martin Ebner (born 1945), Swiss billionaire businessman
- Michele Elliott, author, psychologist, and founder of child protection charity Kidscape
- Manuel Fernandez, former CEO of Gartner, and former chairman of the University of Florida Board of Trustees
- Craig Fleisher, former president of the international association of Strategic and Competitive Intelligence Professionals, chair of the Competitive Intelligence Foundation
- Mary Lou Foy, former president of the National Press Photographers Association
- Bill France Jr., former president of NASCAR
- André-Philippe Futa, former president of Parti de l'Alliance Nationale pour l'Unité
- Todd H. Goldman, founder and CEO of the David and Goliath Company
- Mércio Pereira Gomes, former president of the National Foundation for Indigenous Peoples (FUNAI)
- Alexander Grass, founder and former CEO of Rite Aid
- Ben Hill Griffin III, former chairman and CEO of Alico, Inc.
- Kelsie B. Harder, former president of the American Name Society and professor
- Linda Hudson, former president of BAE Systems' Land & Armaments
- Susan Ivey, current chairman and CEO of Reynolds American
- John Janick, founder and current CEO of Fueled by Ramen Records
- William King, former president of the National Academy of Design
- Anjan Lahiri, current CEO of Birlasoft
- Alan Levine, current CEO of the Broward Hospital District, former Secretary of Florida Agency for Healthcare Administration
- Betsy Markey, current CEO of Syscom Services, former U.S. representative
- Steven Marrs, founder and current CEO of Branded Pictures
- J. Keith Moyer, former publisher of the Minneapolis Star Tribune
- Sara Myers, former president of the American Theological Library Association
- David Nelms, current CEO of Discover Financial
- Nandini Nimbkar, president of Nimbkar Agricultural Research Institute
- Kike Oniwinde, founder of BYP Network
- Fikret Orman, current president of Beşiktaş J.K., a Turkish sports club
- Donna Pastore, current president of the National Association for Girls & Women in Sports
- Herb Peyton, founder and president of the Gate Petroleum Company
- Satya Prabhakar, founder and current CEO of Sulekha
- Gary B. Pruitt, current president and CEO of the Associated Press
- Edward G. Roberts Jr., former president of the Federation of Professional Athletes, inducted to the International Motorsports Hall of Fame
- Howard Roffman, current president of Lucas Licensing
- Al Rosen, former president of the Houston Astros and New York Yankees
- Sachio Semmoto, current CEO for eAccess and eMobile
- Eleanor Smeal, former president of National Organization for Women (NOW)
- Chesterfield Smith, former president of the American Bar Association (ABA)
- W. Reece Smith Jr., former president of the American Bar Association, and the University of South Florida; Rhodes Scholar
- Sung Won Sohn, current CEO of Hanmi Financial Corp, former chief economist of Wells Fargo
- Margaretta Styles, former president of the American Nurses Association
- David M. Thomas, former CEO of IMS Health
- Carlos O. Torano, current president of Toraño Cigars and Central America Tobacco
- Nusli Wadia, chairman of the Wadia Group, son of Neville Wadia and Dina Wadia, grandson of Muhammad Ali Jinnah and Rattanbai Jinnah
- Wayne Weaver, former owner of the Jacksonville Jaguars, current CEO of Shoe Carnival
- Scott Weiss, former CEO of IronPort Systems, Inc.
- Lezlee Westine, current president and CEO of Personal Care Products Council
- Robert Wexler, current president of the Center for Middle East Peace & Economic Cooperation, former U.S. Representative
- Charles F. Willis, former president of Alaska Airlines
- Walter J. Zable, founder, and former chairman and CEO of Cubic Corporation
- Stephen N. Zack, former president of the American Bar Association (ABA)
- Anita Zucker, former governor and chairman of the Hudson's Bay Company
- Balaji Sreenivasan, Technology Entrepreneur, Founder and CEO, Aurigo Software Technologies; recipient of the 2022 MAE Outstanding Alumni Award
- Jerry Zucker, former CEO of the Polymer Group and former governor and chairman of the Hudson's Bay Company

=== Architects ===
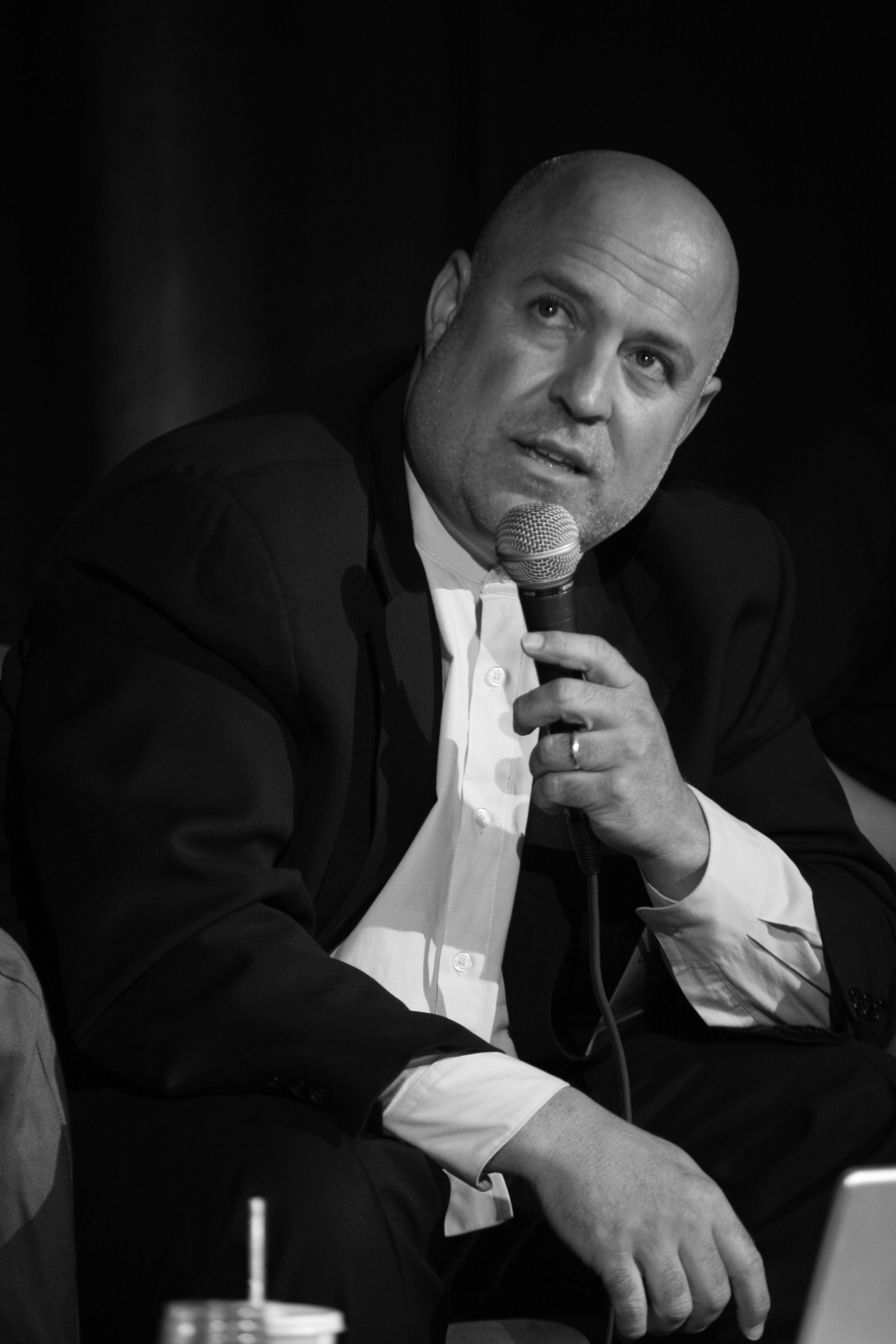
Lawrence Scarpa

- Alberto Alfonso, founding principal and president of Alfonso Architects
- Carlos J. Alfonso, founding principal and CEO of Alfonso Architects, former chairman of the University of Florida Board of Trustees
- Stephen Francis Jones, architect known for high-end restaurant designs
- Beatriz del Cueto Lopez, Cuban-born architect
- Gene Leedy, leading practitioner of the Sarasota School of Architecture
- Aaron Neubert, architect and educator, Principal ANX
- Alfred Browning Parker, Modernist architect
- William Rupp, architect
- Lawrence Scarpa, current CEO of Brooks + Scarpa
- Max Strang, founding principal of Strang Design

=== Athletic directors ===
- Bill Carr, former athletic director for the University of Houston and the University of Florida
- Paul Dee, former athletic director for the University of Miami
- Doug Dickey, former athletic director for the University of Tennessee
- Bill Proctor, former athletic director for Florida State University
- Keith R. Tribble, former athletic director for the University of Central Florida

=== University benefactors ===
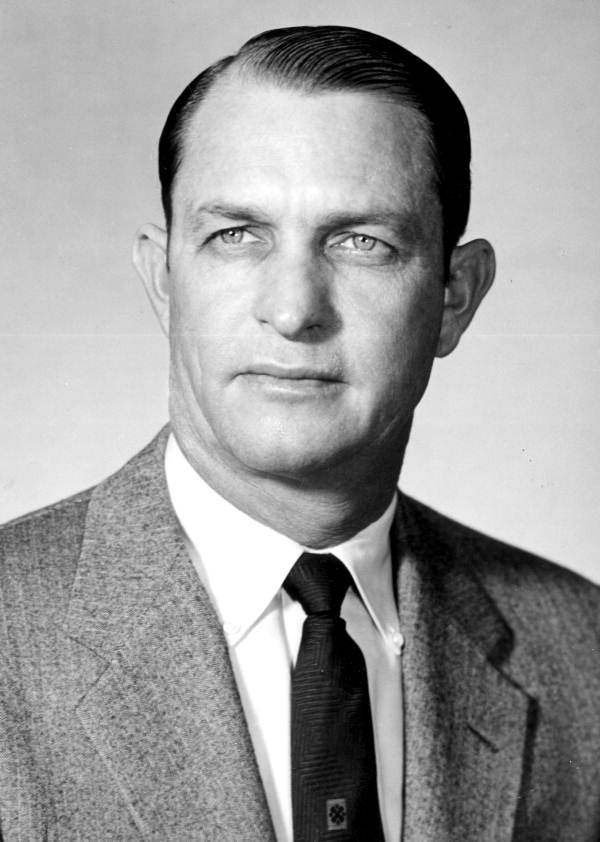
Ben Hill Griffin Jr.

- Ben Hill Griffin Jr., Florida citrus farmer, major University of Florida benefactor, namesake of the university's Ben Hill Griffin Stadium
- Stumpy Harris, prominent attorney, major University of Florida benefactor
- William R. Hough, prominent investment banker, major university benefactor, namesake of the university's Hough Graduate School of Business
- Fred Levin, prominent attorney, major university benefactor, namesake of the university's Levin College of Law,
- Alfred A. McKethan, former chairman of SunTrust Bank, major university benefactor, namesake of the university's Alfred A. McKethan Field
- George Smathers, former U.S. senator, major university benefactor, namesake of university's The George A. Smathers Libraries
- Al Warrington, former CEO of Sanfill, university benefactor, former chairman of UF's board of trustees, namesake of UF's Warrington College of Business
- Herbert Wertheim, inventor, scientist, educator, clinician, entrepreneur, philanthropist and community leader

== Arts, literature, humanities, and entertainment ==
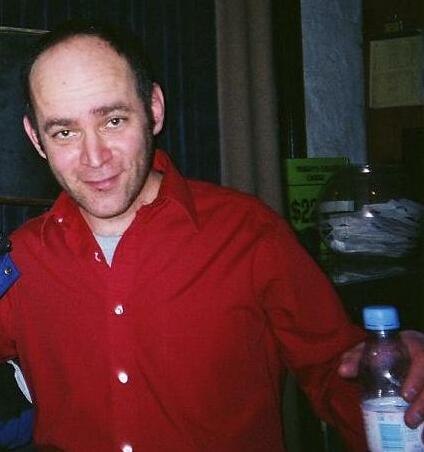
Todd Barry

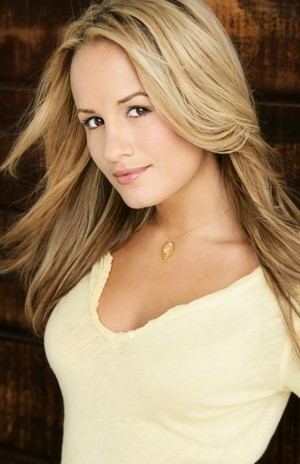
Jenn Brown

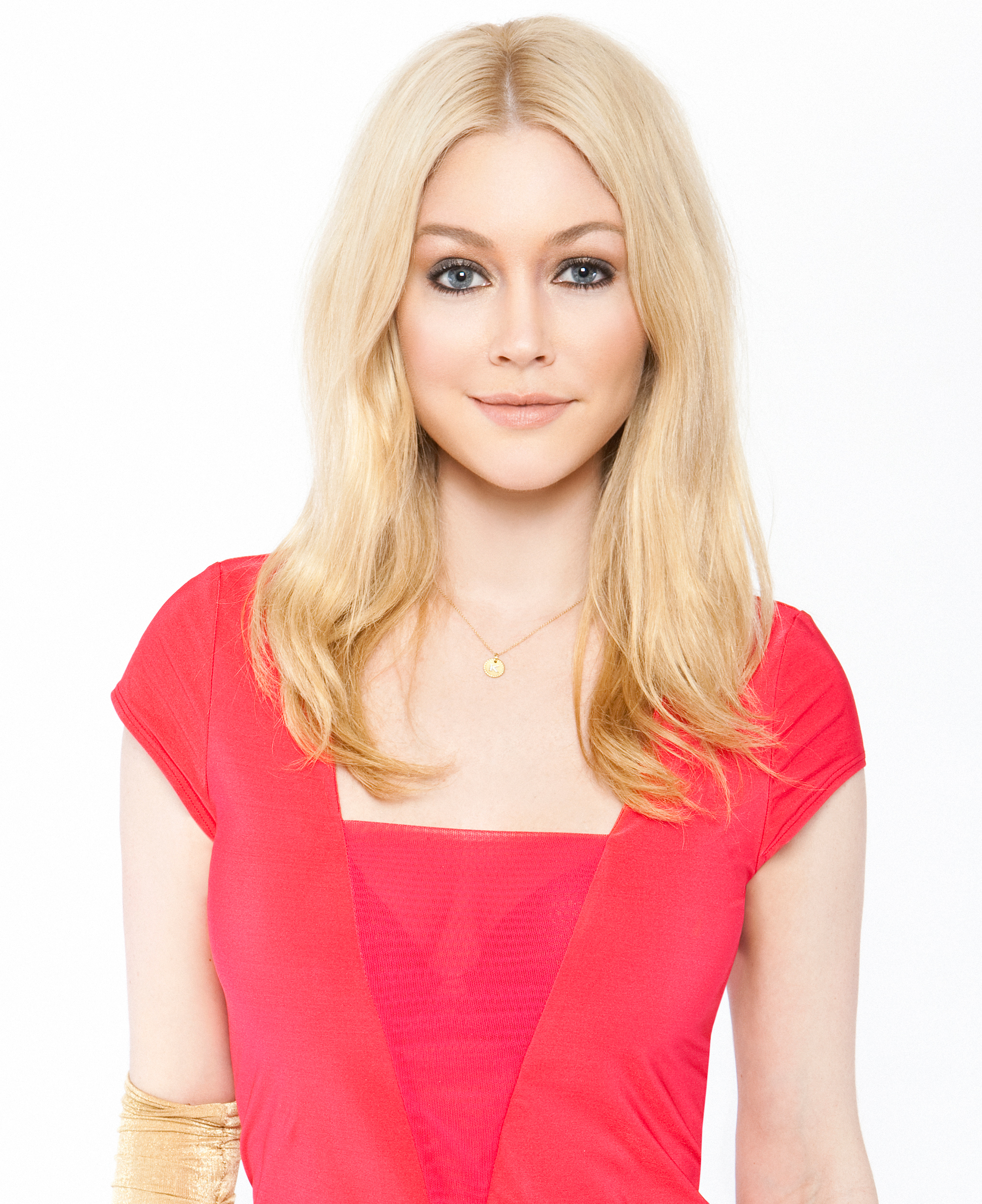
Kelly Carrington

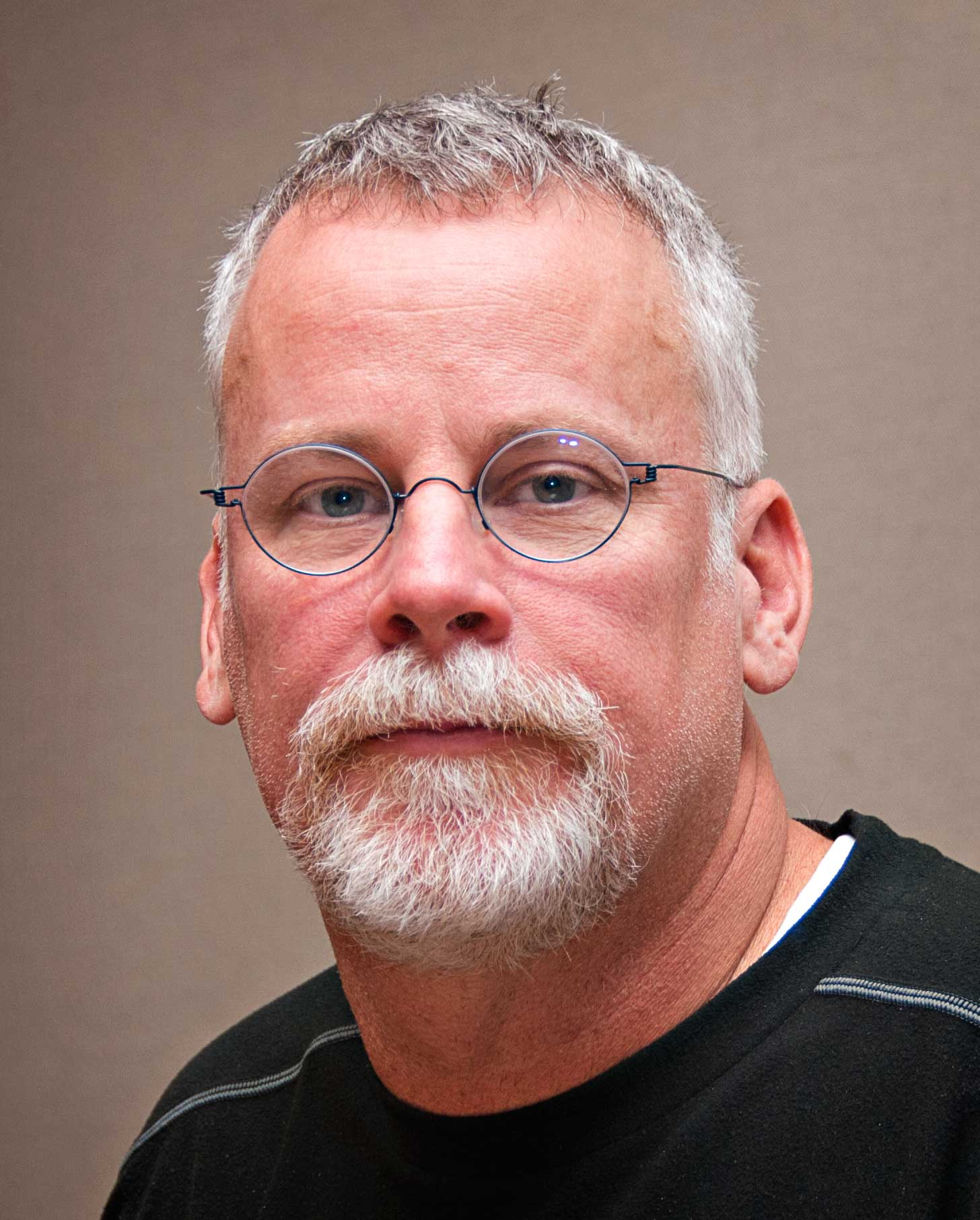
Michael Connelly

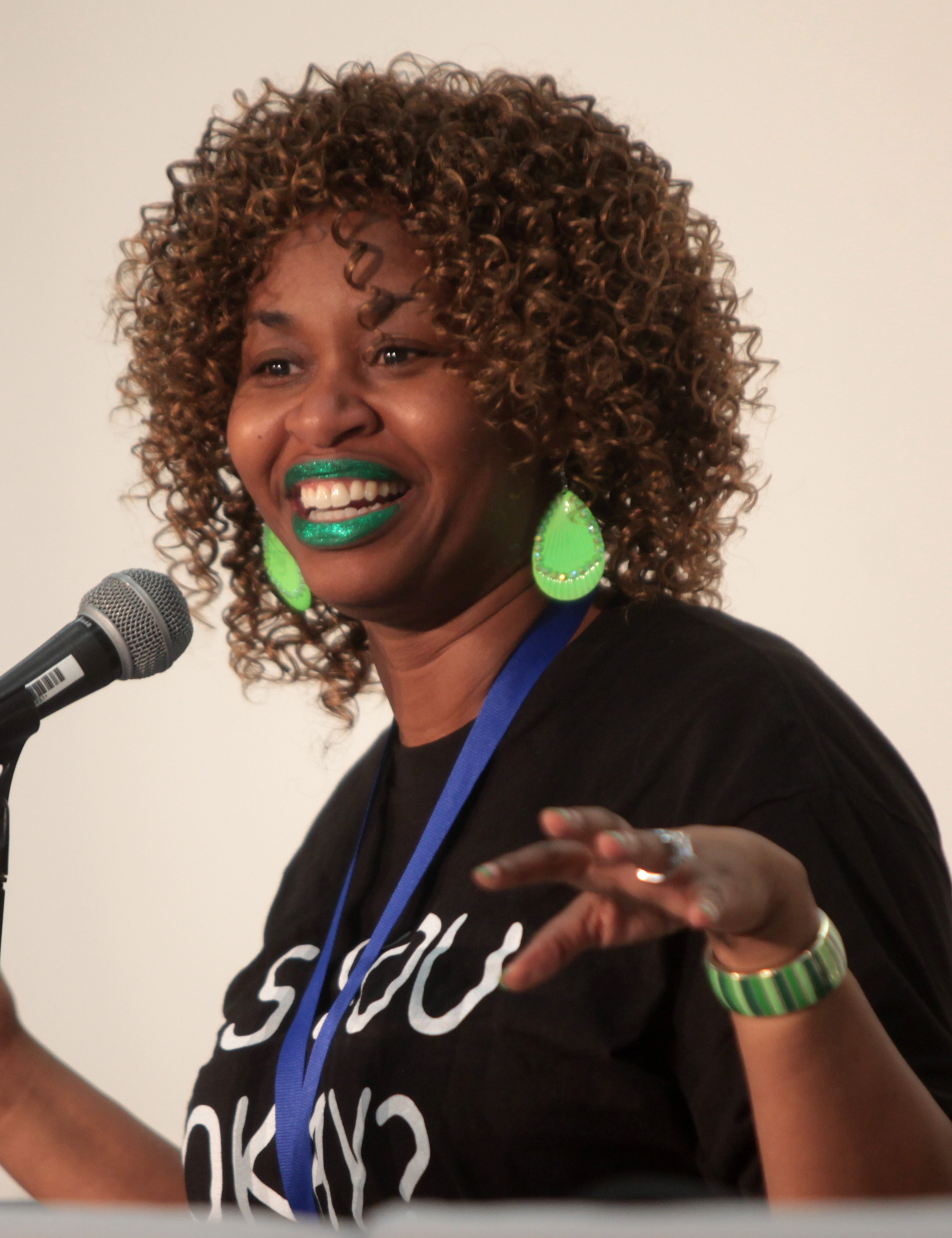
GloZell Green

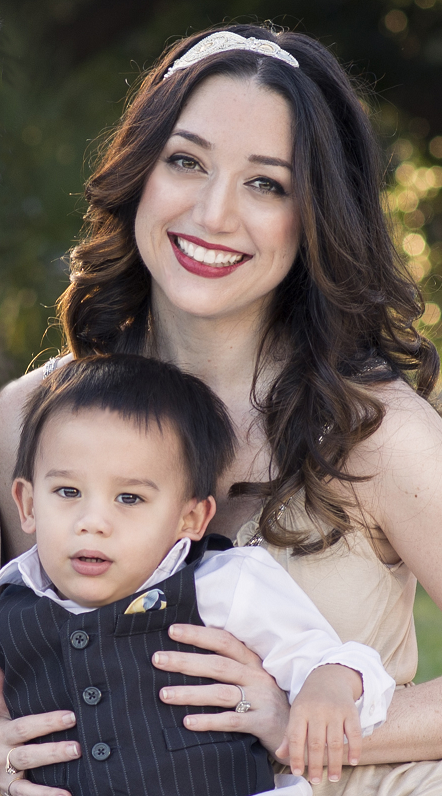
Elise Ippolito

Eliot Kleinberg

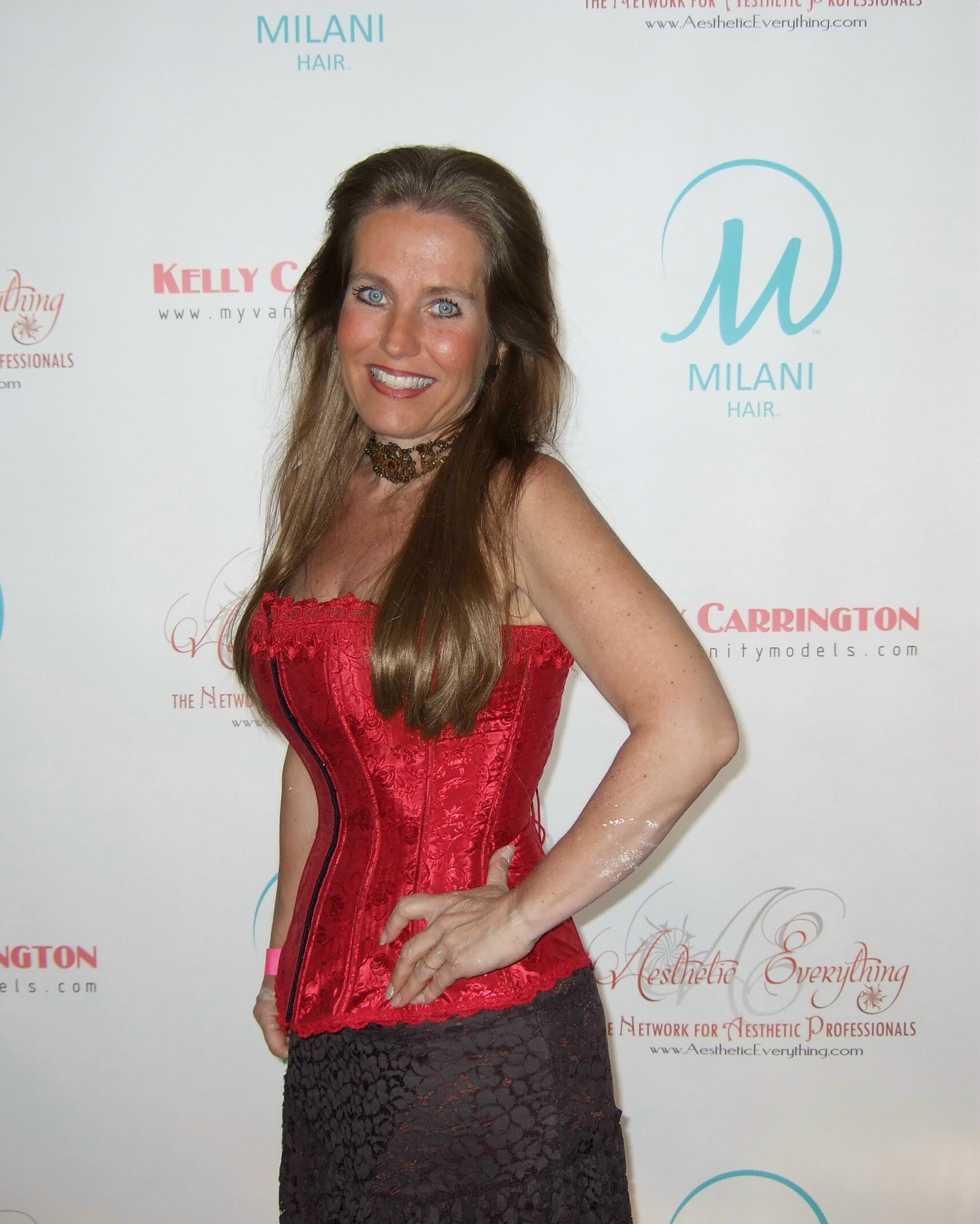
Charlotte Laws

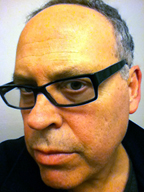
Jon McKenzie

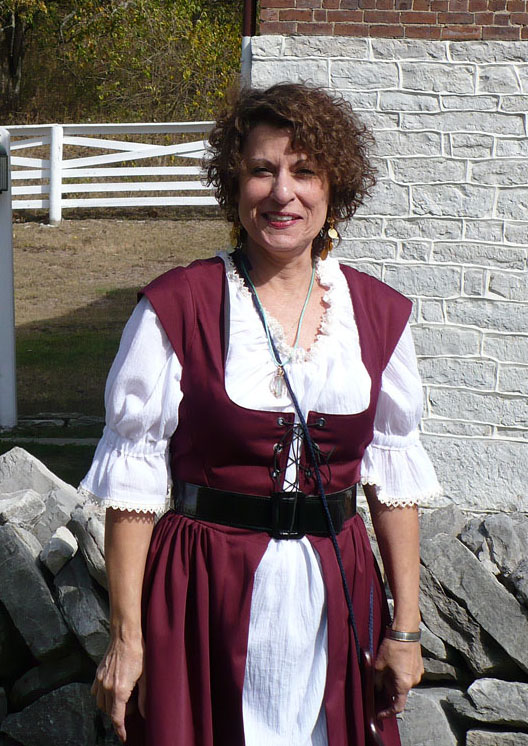
Lorraine Murray

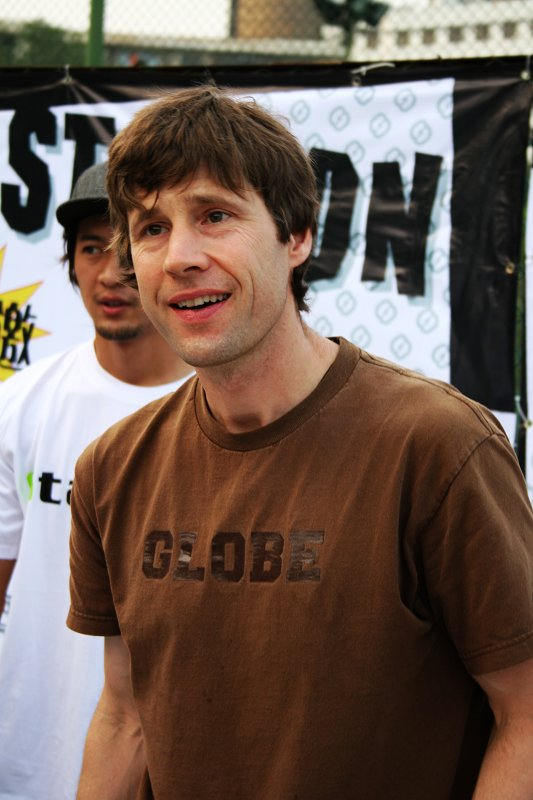
Rodney Mullen

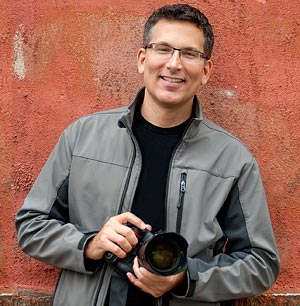
Andrew Prokos

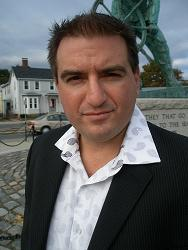
Marc Randazza

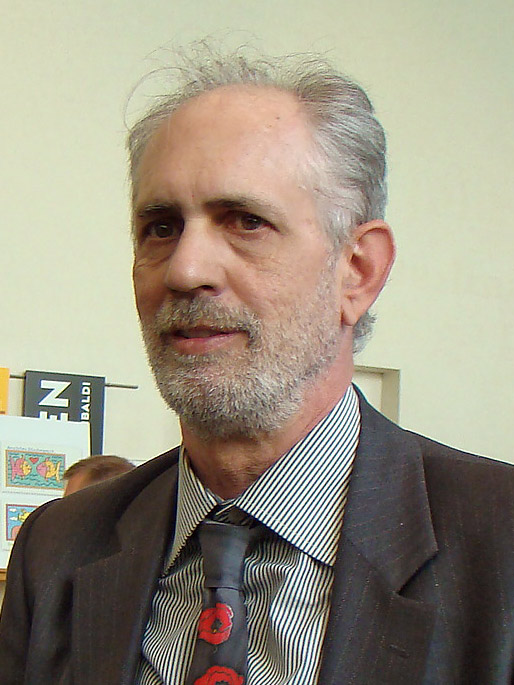
James Rizzi

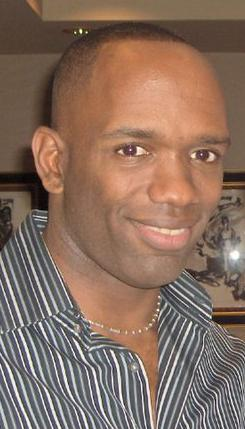
Alan Rogers

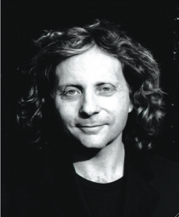
Thane Rosenbaum

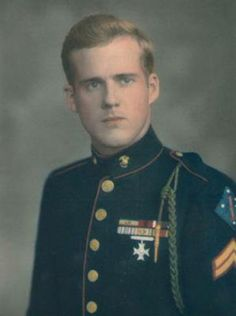
Eugene Sledge

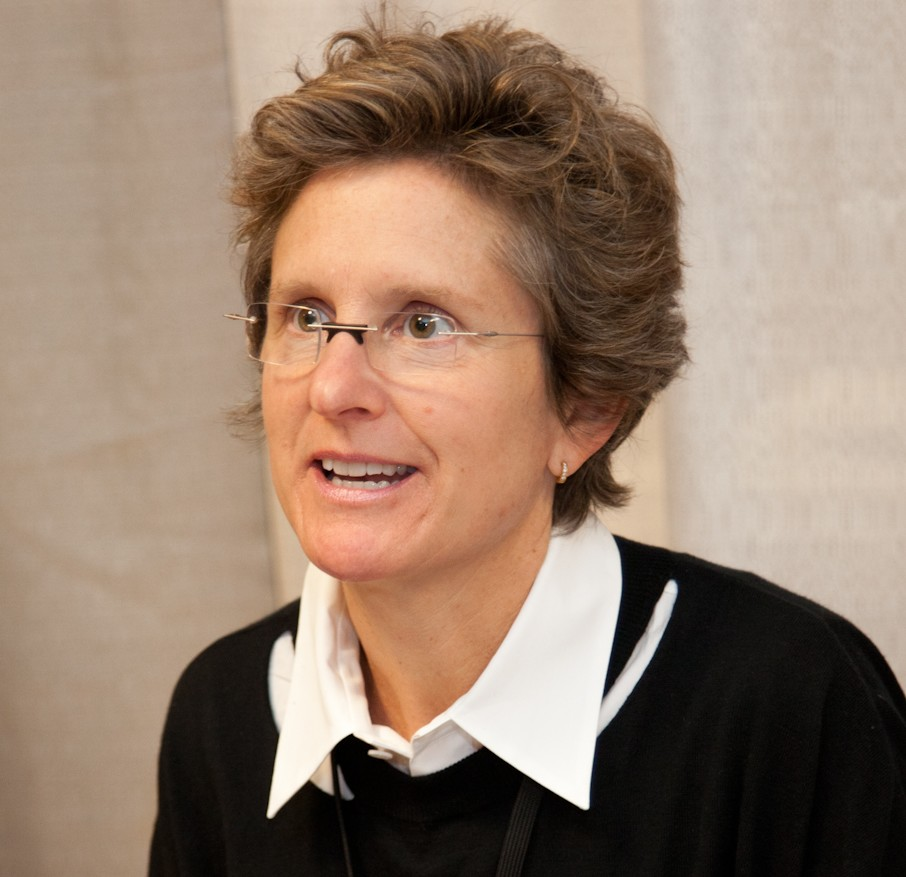
Maggie Taylor

- Shane Acker, filmmaker, 9
- Don Addis, long-time newspaper columnist and syndicated comic strip artist for the St. Petersburg Times
- Chris Adrian, novelist and short-story writer, Gob's Grief
- Siva Ananth, film producer, screenwriter
- Lauren Anderson, model
- Adaeze Atuegwu, writer
- Chris Bachelder, novelist, short-story writer, and e-book pioneer
- Todd Barry, stand-up comedian, actor and voice actor
- Joseph Beckham, writer on the topic of legal problems in education, winner of the McGhehey award, professor of education leadership at Florida State University
- Wayne Besen, former spokesman for the Human Rights Campaign, and gay rights advocate
- Mike Bianchi, sports columnist for the Orlando Sentinel
- Dan Bilzerian, professional poker player, actor, and internet social media personality
- Matt Borondy, publisher for Identity Theory online magazine
- Edward L. Bowen, horse racing historian
- Wendy Brenner, author and professor; Phone Calls From the Dead, Large Animals in Everyday Life: Stories
- Rita Mae Brown, author and activist
- Alan Burnett, television producer and writer
- Mike Burns, music producer
- Al Burt, Miami Herald and Atlanta Journal writer
- Kevin Canty, author; Into the Great Wide Open, Nine Below Zero, and Winslow in Love
- Kelly Carrington, model
- Alfred A. Cave, professor, historian, and author
- Debbie Cenziper, journalist with The Washington Post, and winner of the Pulitzer Prize
- Jean Chance, chairman of the Hearst Awards Committee for 25 years, professor of journalism at the University of Florida
- Peter Christopher, author, Campfires of the Dead
- Michael Connelly, best-selling author
- Paul Cootner, economist, author of The Random Character of Stock Market Prices
- Harry Crews, novelist, short story writer, and essayist
- Mark Curtis, journalist, author, and political analyst
- Jeff Darlington, current sportswriter for the Miami Herald
- Jonathan Demme, motion picture director, won Academy Award for directing for The Silence of the Lambs
- Karen DeYoung, Pulitzer Prize recipient, The Washington Post associate editor
- Kate DiCamillo, children's novelist and screenwriter
- Micki Dickoff, television director and producer, winner of multiple Emmy Awards
- Brian Doherty, senior editor of Reason magazine, author
- Gregg Doyel, sports writer for CBSSports.com
- Brian Drolet, actor, producer and writer
- Louann Fernald, model and actress
- Robert W. Fichter, photographer
- Rich Fields, announcer of The Price Is Right, meteorologist, radio personality, voice actor
- Lolita Files, author, screenwriter, and producer
- Dexter Filkins, Pulitzer Prize-winning journalist
- Jesse Hill Ford, writer and screenwriter
- Michael France, screenwriter for GoldenEye, The Hulk, and Punisher
- Robert Fulton, writer and naturalist
- Alan Gallay, American historian, and winner of the National Endowment for the Humanities Fellowship
- Michael Gannon, military historian and Catholic priest
- Leslie Yalof Garfield, current editor of the Journal of Court Innovation and professor at Pace Law School
- Merrill Gerber, author
- Norman Gilliland, author, WERN host
- GloZell, comedian
- MaryAnne Golon, picture editor for Time magazine
- Philip Graham, former publisher of The Washington Post
- Edwin Granberry, long-time writer of the comic strip Buz Sawyer
- Richard Grayson, writer and political activist
- Rebecca Greer, Woman's Day editor
- James Grippando, novelist and lawyer
- Israel Gutierrez, Miami Herald columnist, former Palm Beach Post columnist
- Nikolas Gvosdev, international relations scholar
- Robert J. Haiman, St. Petersburg Times executive editor, Poynter Institute president
- Rebecca Heflin (pseudonym of Dianne Farb), romance novelist and attorney
- Carol Hernandez, journalist, educator, Pulitzer Prize winner
- Edward D. Hess, author and professor
- Carl Hiaasen, novelist, Miami Herald columnist, won the Newbery Honor
- Rob Hiaasen, The Capital columnist and editor, adjunct journalism professor at the University of Maryland's Philip Merrill College of Journalism, victim of Capital Gazette shooting
- Shere Hite, author of The Hite Report, sex educator, and feminist
- Noy Holland, author of What Begins With Bird and Spectacle of the Body
- Elise Ippolito, artist
- Judith Ivory, best-selling author of historical romance novels
- Jarrod Jablonski, pioneering technical diver and record setting cave diver
- Eberhard Jäckel, German historian
- Jamali, Indian-American painter and sculptor
- Clint Johnson, American historian and author
- Madison Jones, novelist and former professor at Auburn University
- Steven J. Kachelmeier, current editor of The Accounting Review, and professor at the University of Texas
- Artie Kempner, director for FOX Sports
- Stetson Kennedy, author and human rights activist
- Eliot Kleinberg, author and writer for the Palm Beach Post
- Jeff Klinkenberg, author and reporter for the Tampa Bay Times
- Allan J. Kuethe, historian
- Victoria Lancelotta, current editor of the Georgetown Review, author
- Mernet Larsen, artist
- Charlotte Laws, author, talk show host, and community activist
- Gary Russell Libby, art historian, curator, and museum director
- Will Ludwigsen, writer of horror, mystery, and science fiction
- C. J. Lyons, physician and writer of medical suspense novels
- Moss Mabry, costume designer, nominated for four Academy Awards
- Ron Magill, photographer and wildlife expert
- Scooter Magruder, YouTuber
- Thomas E. Mann, author and political pundit for the Brookings Institution
- Gabriel Martinez, Cuban-American artist
- Frances Mayes, author of best-selling book Under the Tuscan Sun
- Michael W. McCann, political scientist
- Andrew McClurg, legal humor writer for the American Bar Association Journal
- Diane McFarlin, publisher of the Sarasota Herald Tribune
- Jon McKenzie, performance and media scholar and practitioner, professor at the University of Wisconsin–Madison
- Tom Meek, columnist and author of Another Day In Cyberville, Reflections On Media, and The Video Audio Overdose Galore
- Myka Meier, etiquette writer
- Louis A. Meyer, writer and painter
- Sam Michel, author of Under the Light; lecturer at University of Massachusetts Amherst
- Jessel Miller, watercolor artist and children's writer
- Andrew Mondshein, nominated for an Oscar for his film editing
- James Morgan, scenic designer and producing artistic director of the York Theatre
- Robert Morris, novelist
- Rodney Mullen, entertainer, skateboarder
- Lorraine Murray, author of Why Me, Why Now?, and Grace Notes
- Jeff Nesmith, journalist, educator, Pulitzer Prize winner
- Lee Ann Newsom, anthropologist, named a MacArthur Fellow for 2002
- Susan Louise O'Connor, film and stage actress
- Ivan Osorio, columnist and editor at the Competitive Enterprise Institute
- Janis Owens, author
- Harvey Eugene Oyer III, author and attorney
- Mike Papantonio, trial lawyer, co-host of Ring of Fire
- Jeff Parker, novelist and short story writer
- John L. Parker Jr., writer
- David Penzer, current professional wrestling ring announcer for the WWE
- Kay Picart, author, artist, radio host, and producer
- Sam Proctor, one of the world's foremost scholars of Florida history
- Andrew Prokos, architectural and fine-art photographer
- Imad Rahman, author, I Dream of Microwaves
- Jeff Randall, former business editor of BBC News
- Marc Randazza, current editor of The Legal Satyricon
- Charlie Reed, current journalist with Stars and Stripes
- Pietra Rivoli, author and professor of finance at Georgetown University
- James Rizzi, pop artist
- Edward G. Roberts Jr., pioneer race car driver of NASCAR
- Alan G. Rogers, gay rights activist, and U.S. Army major who died in Operation Iraqi Freedom
- Thane Rosenbaum, novelist, essayist, and professor of law at Fordham University
- Rektok Ross, fiction writer, journalist, and entertainment host, best known for her contemporary romance novel Prodigal
- Scott Sanders, Emmy Award and Tony Award-winning television producer
- Mia Schaikewitz, TV personality and spokesperson for disability advocacy
- Julia Sell, former national coach for the United States Tennis Association
- Jeffrey Scott Shapiro, investigative journalist and attorney
- Paul Shyre, director and playwright who won a Tony Award and an Emmy Award
- Eugene Sledge, WW2 United States Marine, biologist and university professor; author of With the Old Breed: At Peleliu and Okinawa
- Rick Smith, author, entrepreneur, and public speaker
- George Solomon, former sports editor and columnist for The Washington Post; first ombudsman for ESPN
- Julian Sprung, writer
- Howard Stelzer, composer and performer of electronic music
- Randall J. Stephens, author, editor, and historian of American religion
- Craig Symonds, distinguished American Civil War historian and former professor at the United States Naval Academy
- Maggie Taylor, digital imaging artist
- Janet Todd, Welsh-born author on books about women's literature; professor at the University of Aberdeen
- Kendra Todd, real estate businesswoman and winner of The Apprentice 3 reality TV show
- Victor Andres Triay, Cuban-American historian and writer
- Natasha Tsakos, performing artist and conceptual director
- Claudio Véliz, Chilean author, historian, and Sociologist
- Robert Venditti, comic book writer
- Tarita Virtue, Trinidadian-American private detective, investigator, and model
- Sterling Watson, writer, Weep No More My Brother, The Calling, and Blind Tongues
- Bill Whittle, blogger, political commentator, director, screenwriter, editor, pilot, and author
- Edward Walton Wilcox, painter and sculptor
- Andrew Wilkow, conservative political talk radio host on Sirius Satellite Radio
- Hugh Wilson, director, writer, and actor
- Kevin Wilson, writer
- Edward Yang, Taiwanese filmmaker, winner of Best Director Award at Cannes for his 2000 film Yi Yi
- Hugo Zacchini, entertainer known as the "Human Cannonball"

=== Actors and actresses ===
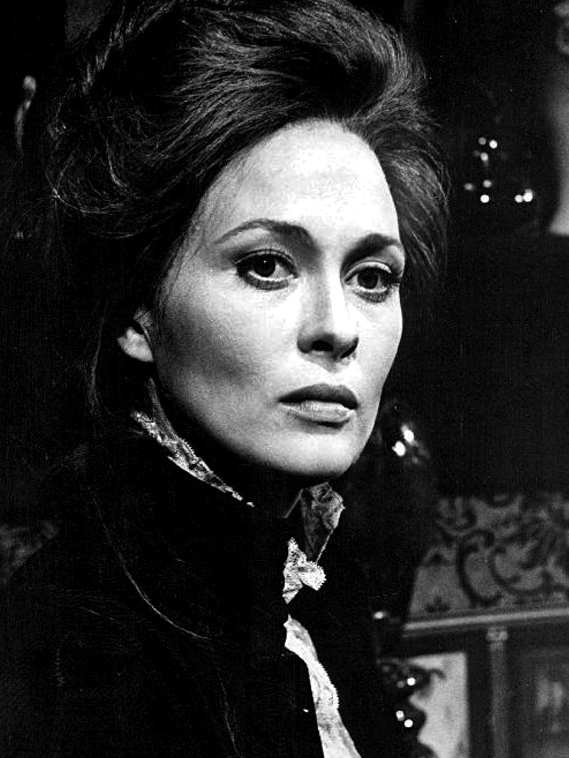
Faye Dunaway

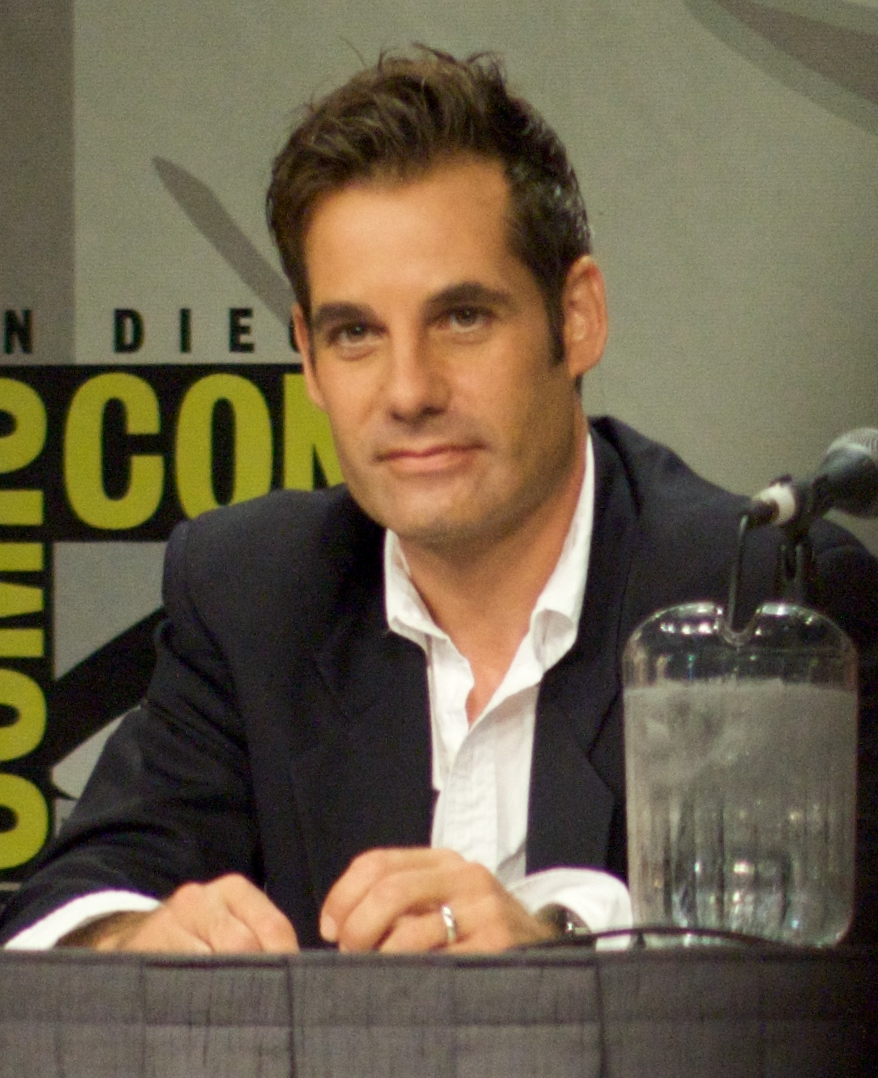
Adrian Pasdar

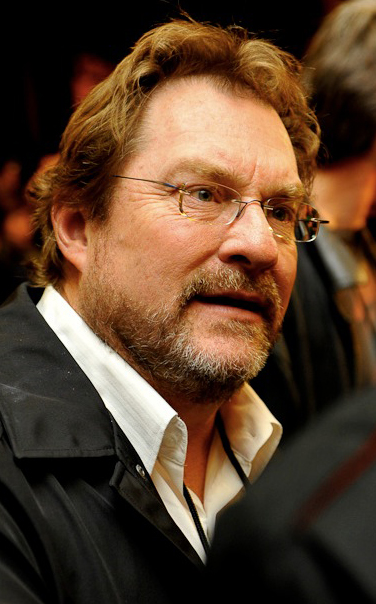
Stephen Root

- Casey Calvert, actress
- Kavita Channe, television and radio personality
- Jonathan Chase, actor, One on One, Another Gay Movie, Gingerdead Man, and 7eventy 5ive
- Richard E. Council, stage, television and film actor
- Abigail Cowen, actress
- Cathy Jenéen Doe, actress, Passions, Ed, and Buds for Life
- Kahil Dotay, actor, director, writer; won an award for his performance in Frank & Flo
- Faye Dunaway, actress, won an Academy Award for the movie Network
- Brian F. Durkin, actor, Broken Bridges, The O.C., and Deja Vu
- Buddy Ebsen, actor, best known as Jed Clampett on The Beverly Hillbillies
- Malcolm Gets, actor, Caroline in the City
- Darrell Hammond, actor and comedian, Saturday Night Live, Scary Movie 3, Epic Movie, and Agent Cody Banks
- Gavin Houston, actor, The Cosby Show
- Jes Macallan, actress, Mistresses
- Cameron David Magruder, actor and comedian
- Patty Maloney, actress, Far Out Space Nuts
- Vincent Martella, actor, Phineas and Ferb and Everybody Hates Chris
- Patrick O'Neal, television and film actor
- Adrian Pasdar, actor on Heroes, Profit, and Near Dark
- Rain Phoenix, actress and musician
- Lenny Platt, actor best known for his portrayal of Nate Salinger on the US daytime soap opera One Life to Live
- Angelique Rivera, actress
- Stephen Root, Emmy-nominated actor, best known as "Milton" in Office Space and for his performance in Dodgeball
- George Salazar, actor, Be More Chill
- Wil Shriner, actor, director and game show host
- Rachel Specter, actress in Prom Night, The House Bunny, and Alone in the Dark II
- Nancy Stafford, actress on Sidekicks, Matlock, and Judging Amy, and former Miss Florida
- Toby Turner, internet personality, actor, comedian and musician
- Dale Van Sickel, former president of the Stuntmen's Association of Motion Pictures
- Bob Vila, actor, home-improvement guru and former host of This Old House
- Tarita Virtue, Trinidadian actress and model on The Unit and Living the Dream
- Alisha Wainwright, actress
- Jordan Wall, television and film actor
- Robin Weisman, actress on Three Men and a Little Lady, and Thunder in Paradise
- Valerie Wildman, actress, known for Beverly Hills, 90210 and Days of Our Lives
- Jack Youngblood, Emmy-nominated actor, author, and NFL/College Football Hall of Famer

=== Head football coaches ===
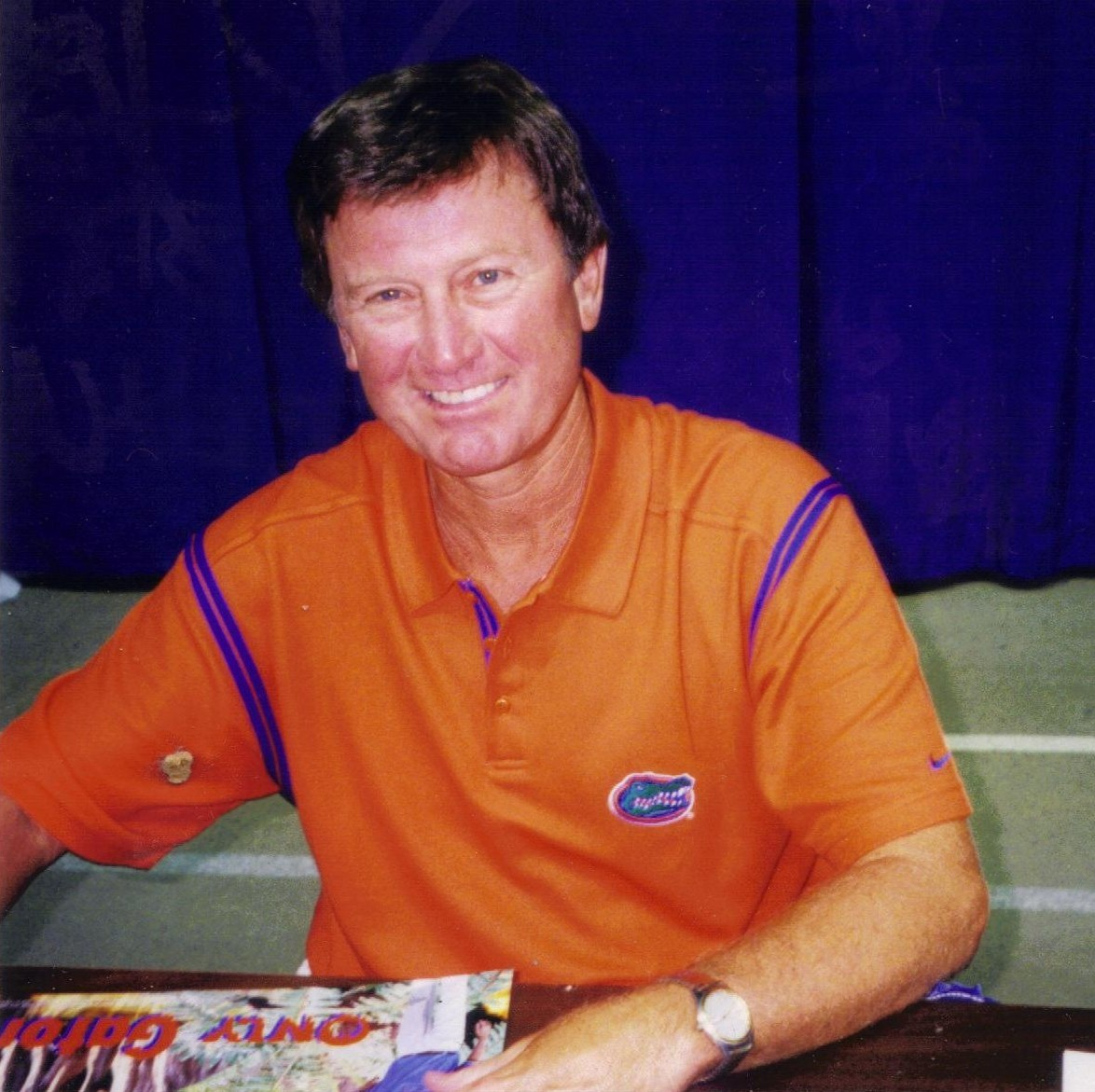
Steve Spurrier

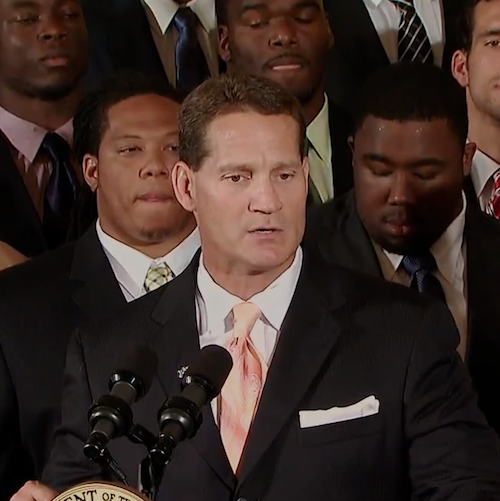
Gene Chizik

- Kerwin Bell, former head coach for the Valdosta State Blazers and Jacksonville Dolphins, current offensive coordinator for the USF Bulls
- Gene Chizik, former head coach for the Auburn Tigers, former head coach of the Iowa State Cyclones
- Doug Dickey, former head coach for the Tennessee Volunteers and Florida Gators
- Chan Gailey, former head coach for the Buffalo Bills, Dallas Cowboys, and Georgia Tech Yellow Jackets
- Fred Goldsmith, former head coach for the Duke Blue Devils and the Rice Owls
- Todd Haley, former head coach of the Kansas City Chiefs
- Kim Helton, former head coach for the Houston Cougars
- Marcelino Huerta, former head coach of the Tampa Spartans, the Wichita State Shockers and Parsons College
- Lindy Infante, former head coach for the Green Bay Packers and Indianapolis Colts
- Mike Mularkey, former head coach for the Tennessee Titans, Jacksonville Jaguars and Buffalo Bills
- Steve Spurrier, former head coach for the Florida Gators, South Carolina Gamecocks, Duke Blue Devils, Tampa Bay Bandits, and Washington Redskins
- Kay Stephenson, former head coach of the Buffalo Bills
- Charlie Strong, former head coach for the South Florida Bulls, former head coach for the Texas Longhorns and Louisville Cardinals, former interim head coach for the Florida Gators
- John Symank, former head coach for the Northern Arizona Lumberjacks and Texas–Arlington Mavericks
- Charlie Tate, former head coach for the Miami Hurricanes

=== Musicians ===
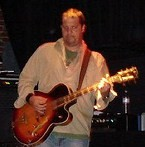
Andrew Copeland

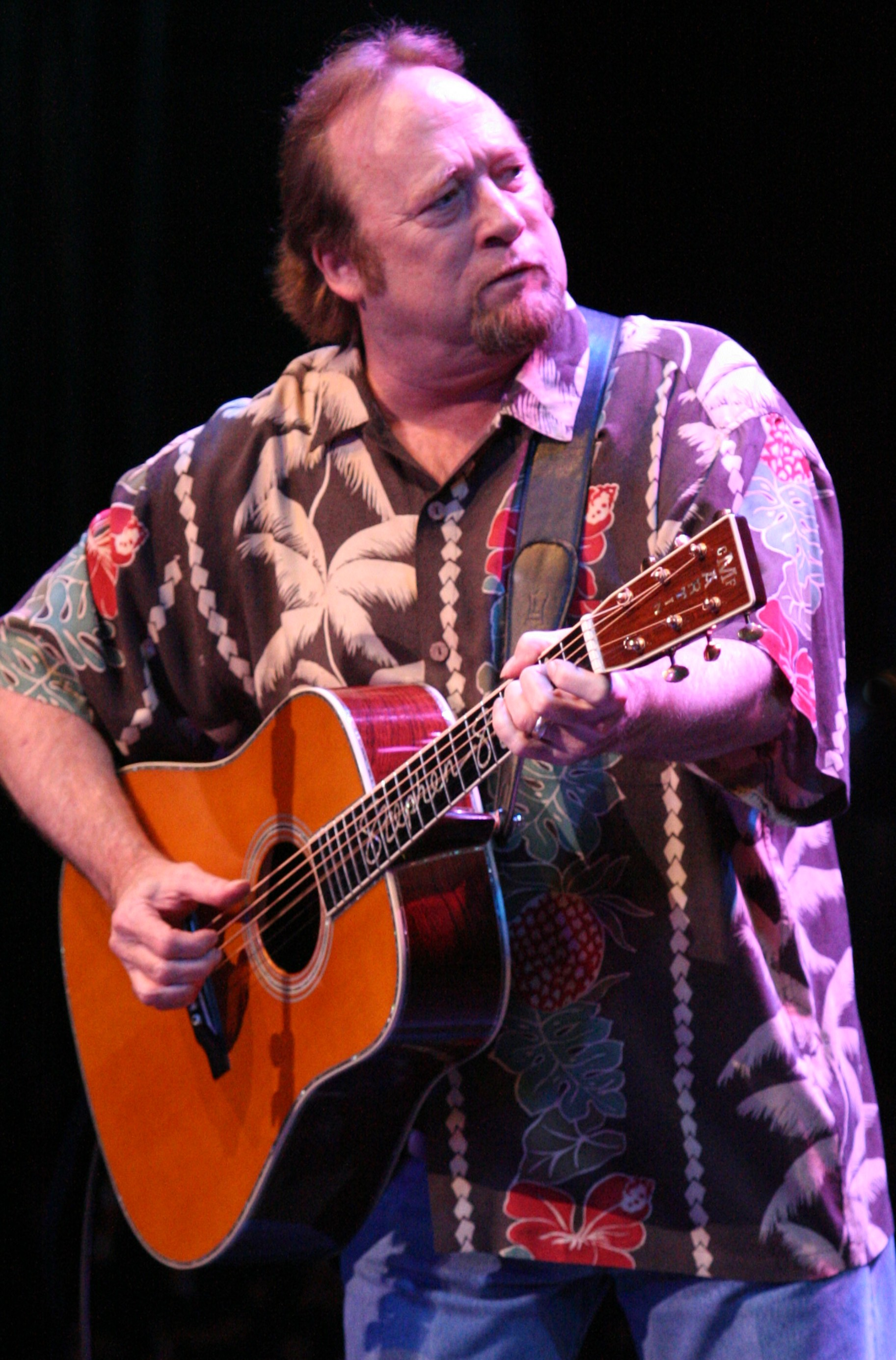
Stephen Stills

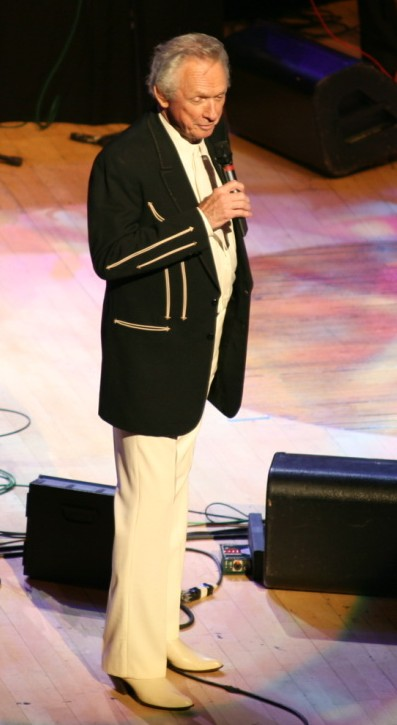
Mel Tillis

- Gene Adkinson, baritone for the band the Dream Weavers
- Stanley Benton, hip-hop artist who goes by the name Stat Quo
- Bob Bryar, drummer for the band My Chemical Romance
- Wade Buff, lead singer for the Dream Weavers
- Brian Carpenter, composer, multi-instrumentalist, singer, songwriter, and radio producer
- Christina Cewe, singer and competitor on American Idol
- Easton Corbin, country music artist
- Chris Demakes, co-founder and lead singer for Less than Jake
- Vinnie Fiorello, co-founder and drummer for Less than Jake
- Alejandro Manzano, musician, singer, and songwriter
- Fabian Manzano, guitarist, and songwriter
- James Melton, singer, actor, named to the Hollywood Walk of Fame
- Slack Season, alternative rock group formed by UOF alumni
- Stat Quo, rapper, degree in International Business and Economics
- Howard Stelzer, electronic composer
- Stephen Stills, member of bands CSNY and Buffalo Springfield
- Keni Thomas, country music singer
- Mel Tillis, singer, songwriter, and comedian
- Johnny Tillotson, singer, and songwriter
- Peter Traub, composer of electronic and acoustic music
- Toby Turner, singer, actor, comedian, and internet personality
- T. Edward Vives, current musical director for the Los Alamos Community Winds

=== Pageantry ===
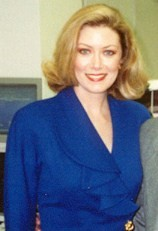
Nancy Stafford

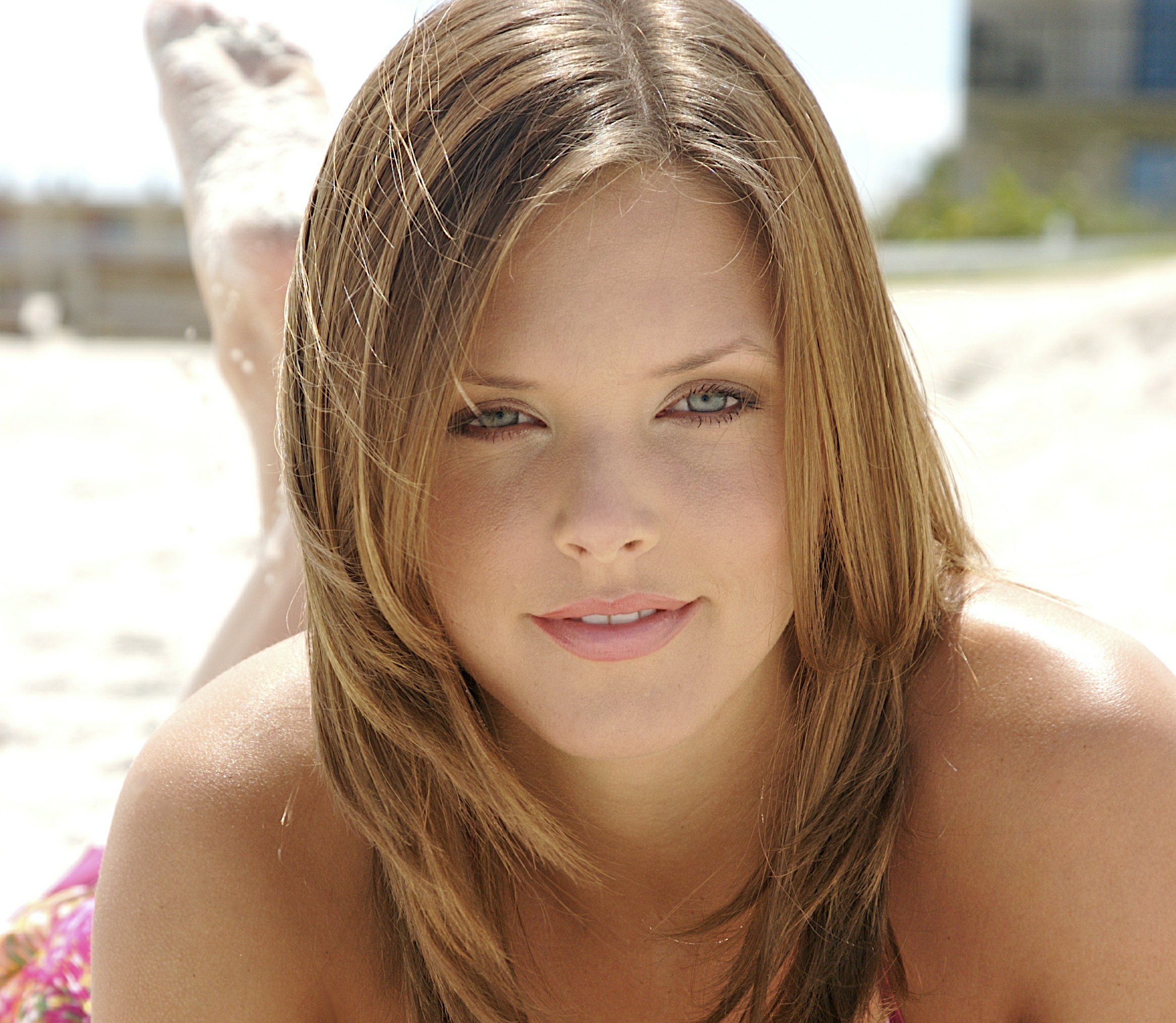
Melissa Witek

- Kristen Berset, Miss Florida USA for 2004, finalist for Miss USA pageant, current model
- Michelyn Butler, Miss Wisconsin USA for 2008
- Ann Gloria Daniel, Miss Florida for 1954
- Julie Donaldson, Miss Florida USA for 2001
- Elizabeth Fechtel, Miss America's Outstanding Teen for 2012
- Mary Katherine Fechtel, Miss Florida for 2015
- Myrrhanda Jones, Miss Florida for 2013
- Allison Kreiger, Miss Florida for 2006
- Kristin Ludecke, Miss Florida for 1995, and Miss Florida USA for 2000
- Laura McKeeman Rutledge, Miss Florida for 2012 and host of SEC Nation
- Molly Pesce, Miss Florida 1986, actress
- Jaclyn Raulerson, Miss Florida for 2010
- Nancy Stafford, Miss Florida for 1976, actress
- Mari Wilensky, Miss Florida for 2005, top-ten finalist at Miss America pageant
- Melissa Witek, Miss Florida USA for 2005, top-five finalist at Miss USA pageant, and contestant on NBC's Treasure Hunters

=== Poets ===
- Deborah Ager, poet, co-founder of 32 Poems literary magazine
- Joe Bolton, regional poet who wrote Days of Summer Gone, The Last Nostalgia Poems, and Breckinridge County Suite
- Geoffrey Brock, poet, poetry translator, and professor at the University of Arkansas
- Stephen Corey, poet and current editor of The Georgia Review
- Geri Doran, poet, professor of creative writing at the University of Oregon, author of Resin and Sanderlings
- Robert Bernard Hass, poet, professor of English at Edinboro University, author of Going by Contraries: Robert Frost's Conflict With Science and Counting Thunder
- Randall Mann, poet, author of Breakfast with Thom Gunn and Complaint in the Garden, recipient of Kenyon Prize
- Orlando Ricardo Menes, Cuban-American poet and teacher at the University of Notre Dame
- C. Dale Young, poet and short-story writer, oncologist, professor of creative writing at Warren Wilson College

=== Reporters, correspondents, and newscasters ===
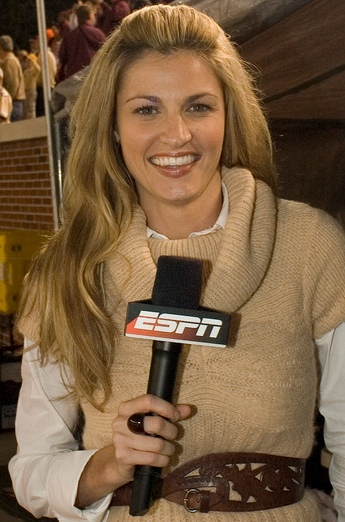
Erin Andrews

Jamie McIntyre

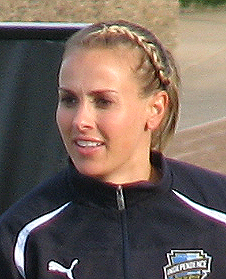
Heather Mitts

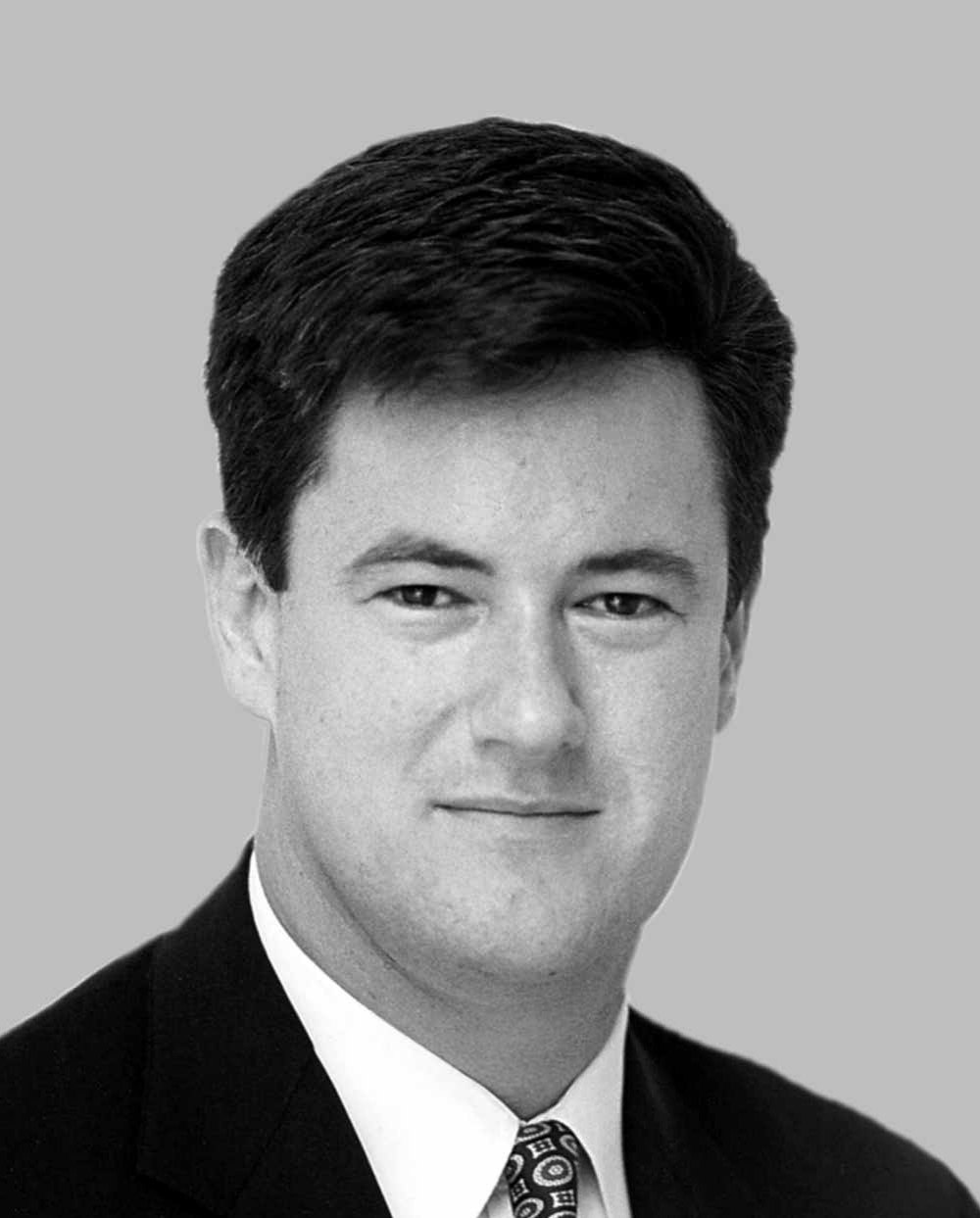
Joseph Scarborough

- Stephanie Abrams, reporter for The Weather Channel
- Erin Andrews, reporter for Fox Sports and formerly ESPN
- Edward Aschoff, reporter for ESPN
- Sharyl Attkisson, former correspondent for CBS News
- Jackie Bange, current anchor with WGN-TV
- Kristen Berset, current anchor for WBFF
- Ernie Bjorkman, former anchor for KWGN-TV in Denver, and winner of two Emmy Awards
- Pam Bondi, correspondent for Fox News
- Jenn Brown, two-time Emmy Award-winning sports reporter for ESPN
- Kavita Channe, television and radio personality, known for appearing on Paradise Hotel
- Linda Church, morning weather anchor for WPIX in New York
- Bob Collins, former broadcaster for WGN-TV in Chicago
- Mark Curtis, current anchor for WLNE-TV
- H. G. Davis Jr., Pulitzer Prize-winning reporter
- Jamie Dupree, correspondent for Cox Broadcasting Washington News Bureau
- David Finkel, journalist and Pulitzer Prize-winning reporter for The Washington Post
- Kristin Harmel, novelist and reporter for People magazine
- Dan Hicken, sports director and anchor for WTLV/WJXX in Jacksonville, Florida
- Susan Hutchison, former anchor for KIRO-TV in Seattle, Washington
- Ian D. Johnson, current Berlin bureau chief for The Wall Street Journal, Pulitzer Prize winner
- Jennifer Lopez, meteorologist for The Weather Channel
- Jamie McIntyre, news anchor for NPR's All Things Considered and former senior Pentagon correspondent for CNN
- Heather Mitts, former reporter for ABC/ESPN, three-time Olympic gold medalist with the USWNT, professional soccer player
- Jeff Nesmith, journalist and Pulitzer Prize winner
- Howard Norton, won the Pulitzer Prize in 1947 for his reporting
- Elizabeth Prann, current reporter with the Fox News Channel
- Raul Ramirez, 1969 editor of Florida Alligator; print and broadcast journalist and executive, educator; activist in promoting independent reporting and diversity in the profession
- Laura Rutledge, anchor/reporter with SEC Network/ESPN
- Forrest Sawyer, current anchorman for ABC News and winner of the George Foster Peabody Award, five National Emmy Awards, two Edward Murrow Awards, and an Associated Press Award
- Joe Scarborough, current MSNBC talk show host, and former US representative
- Sara Sidner, international correspondent with CNN
- Alison Starling, Emmy Award-winning anchor for ABC affiliate WJLA-TV News in Washington, D.C.
- Hal Suit, television broadcaster, formerly with WSB-TV in Atlanta; 1970 Republican gubernatorial nominee in Georgia, lost to Jimmy Carter

=== Sportcasters ===
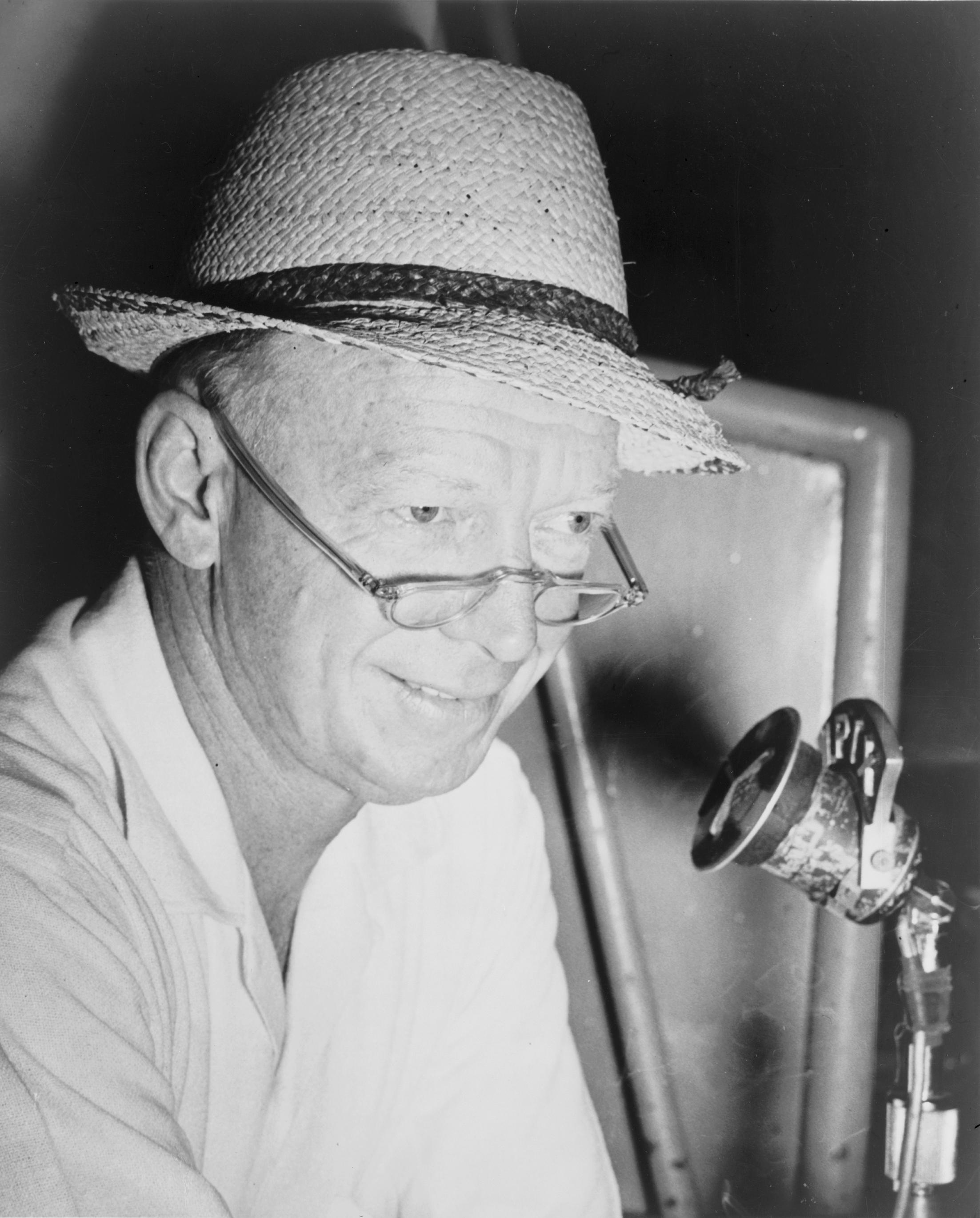
Red Barber

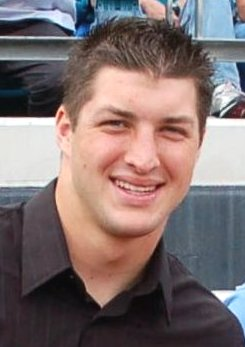
Tim Tebow

- Red Barber, long-time radio sportscaster for the Brooklyn Dodgers and New York Yankees
- Lomas Brown, television commentator for ESPN and former NFL offensive tackle
- Kevin Carter, television commentator for ESPN and former NFL defensive end
- Bob Collins, broadcaster
- Cris Collinsworth, television commentator for HBO's Inside the NFL and Fox NFL Sunday, and former NFL wide receiver
- Gene Deckerhoff, current radio announcer for the Tampa Bay Buccaneers and Florida State Seminoles, and formerly for the Arena Football League
- Julie Donaldson, former sports commentator for WHDH-TV
- Ferdie Pacheco, former Showtime boxing analyst, and personal physician to Muhammad Ali
- Jesse Palmer, television commentator for ESPN/ABC, NFL Insider for TSN, former NFL quarterback, and star of ABC's The Bachelor
- Laura Rutledge, television commentator for SEC Network/ESPN Get Up!, First Take, and SportsCenter host
- Elfi Schlegel-Dunn, gymnastics and sports commentator for NBC Sports
- Lauren Shehadi, current sportscaster for MLB Network
- Emmitt Smith, television commentator for ESPN, Pro Football Hall of Fame former NFL running back, and NFL career rushing yards leader
- Chris Snode, Olympic diving commentator for BBC and EuroSport since 1988
- Tim Tebow, television commentator for SEC Network/ESPN and former NFL quarterback

== Sports ==
=== Basketball (NBA) ===
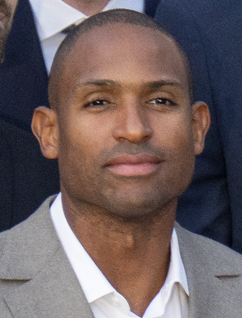
Al Horford

=== Basketball (former Gators still playing in college) ===
- Xaivian Lee (born 2004), Canadian guard who played for the Gators in 2025–26 before transferring to Gonzaga
- Olivier Rioux (born 2006), Canadian center and tallest college player in history; redshirted in 2024–25 and played sparingly in 2025–26 before transferring to UC Irvine

=== Overseas (non-NBA) ===
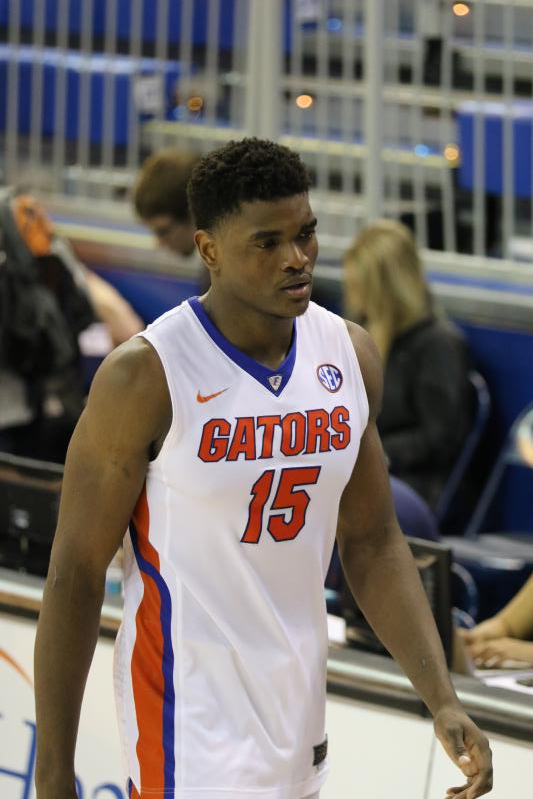
John Egbunu

- Kerry Blackshear Jr. (born 1997), basketball player in the Israeli Basketball Premier League
- John Egbunu (born 1994), Nigerian-born American basketball player for Hapoel Jerusalem of the Israeli Basketball Premier League
- Jalen Hudson (born 1996), basketball player in the Israeli Basketball Premier League
- Kenny Kadji (born 1988), Cameroonian basketball player in the Israeli Basketball Premier League
- Egor Koulechov (born 1994), Israeli-Russian professional basketball player for Israeli team Ironi Nahariya
- Casey Prather (born 1991), basketball player in the Israeli Basketball Premier League
- Nimrod Tishman (born 1991), Israeli basketball player in the Israeli Basketball Premier League
- Alex Tyus (born 1988), American-Israeli professional basketball player, also plays for the Israeli national basketball team
- Scottie Wilbekin (born 1993), basketball player for Maccabi Tel Aviv of the Israeli Premier League and the EuroLeague

=== eSports ===
- Juan DeBiedma, top ranked Super Smash Bros. Melee player and video game streamer, known as Hungrybox

== See also ==
- List of Levin College of Law graduates
- List of University of Florida Athletic Hall of Fame members
- List of University of Florida faculty and administrators
- List of University of Florida honorary degree recipients
- List of University of Florida presidents
- University of Florida Board of Trustees
