= Carlo Ponti (conductor) =

Italian orchestral conductor (born 1968)

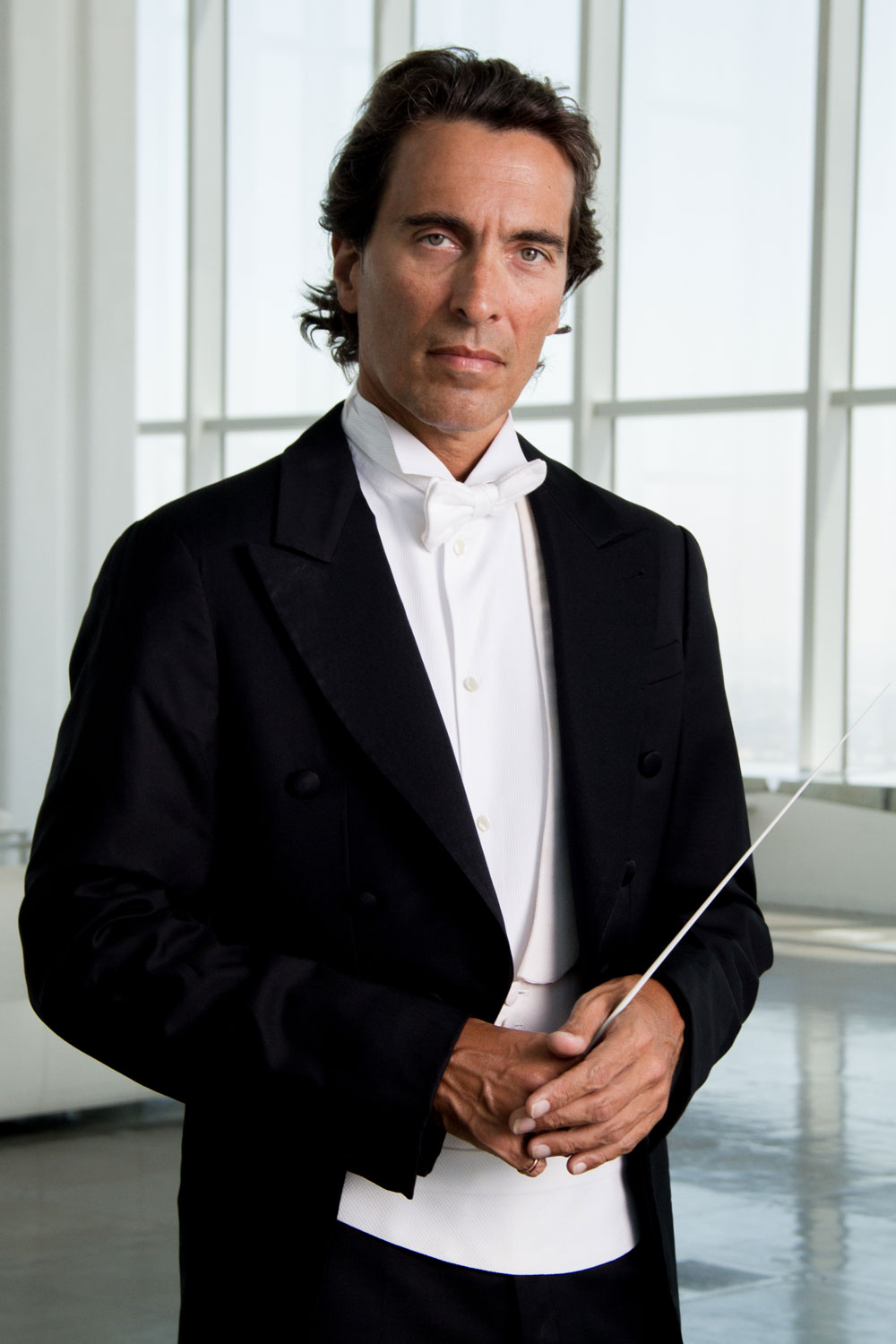
Ponti in 2019

Carlo Ponti Jr. (born 29 December 1968) is an Italian orchestral conductor working in the United States. He is a son of late film producer Carlo Ponti Sr. and Italian actress Sophia Loren, and the elder brother of film director Edoardo Ponti.

== Early life ==
Born in Geneva, Switzerland, Ponti worked at the Conductor's Institute in Connecticut, under the direction of Harold Farberman from 1994 to 1996, worked with Mehli Mehta, Zubin Mehta, and Andrey Boreyko in Los Angeles from 1997 to 1999, and furthered his musical studies in Austria at the Vienna Musikhochschule from 1999 to 2001 under Leopold Hager and Erwin Acel.

== Career ==
Ponti has guest conducted internationally and was the recipient of various awards for fostering the growth of young musical talent through music education. He has been associate conductor of the Russian National Orchestra from 2000 to 2018 and was music director and principal conductor of the San Bernardino Symphony from 2001 to 2013. In 2013 he founded the Los Angeles Virtuosi Orchestra, an ensemble emphasizing music's educational value of which he is artistic and music director. The Los Angeles Virtuosi Orchestra is currently performing its twelfth concert season (2026–2027) in Los Angeles.

Ponti has released two recordings with the Russian National Orchestra on the Pentatone label and his work and performances have been featured on ABC, CBS, NBC/Universal, NPR, PBS, ORF, Sky News, Spectrum, KTLA, Fox News, Leonard Lopate, Dennis Miller, Symphony Magazine, Classical KUSC, the Associated Press, American Public Media's Performance Today and America's Music Festivals.

== Personal life ==
On 18 September 2004, Ponti married Hungarian violinist Andrea Mészáros. They have two children, both born in Geneva. Ponti and Mészáros divorced in 2022. On 26 July 2025, Carlo Ponti married Georgian fitness trainer Mariam Sharmanashvili. After the wedding, he converted to Orthodox Christianity.

== Orchestral ensembles conducted by Carlo Ponti ==
Listed alphabetically

- Academy of St. Martin in the Fields
- ADDA Simfonica
- Alba Regia Symphony Orchestra
- American Youth Symphony
- Belgrade Philharmonic Orchestra
- Budapest Concert Orchestra
- Budapest Strings Orchestra
- Cape Town Philharmonic Orchestra
- Cape Town Youth Orchestra
- Castile and Leon Symphony Orchestra
- Cyprus Symphony Orchestra
- Festival Orchestra NAPA
- Los Angeles Virtuosi Orchestra
- Georgian Philharmonic Orchestra
- Orquesta Sinfónica de Mineria
- Moscow Chamber Orchestra
- Napa Valley Symphony Orchestra
- Orquesta Sinfónica de Galicia
- Orchestra del Maggio Musicale Fiorentino
- Orchestra della Magna Grecia
- Málaga Philharmonic Orchestra
- Felix Mendelssohn Jugendorchester
- Coro e Orchestra del Teatro San Carlo
- Orchestre Philharmonique de Strasbourg
- Orquesta de Valencia
- Pro Arte Orchestra
- Roma Sinfonietta Orchestra
- Russian National Orchestra
- Orchestra della Repubblica di San Marino
- Samara Philharmonic Orchestra
- San Bernardino Symphony
- Simon Bolivar Symphony Orchestra
- Slovak Philharmonic Orchestra
- Sphinx Symphony Orchestra
- Chorus and Orchestra of the State Opera of Georgia
- Taurida State Symphony Orchestra
- Verbier Festival Orchestra
- Veryovka Ukrainian Folk Choir
- Winnipeg Symphony Orchestra
- UCLA Philharmonia Orchestra
- Ural Philharmonic Orchestra

== Festival and event appearances ==
Listed alphabetically

- Avila Primavera Fest, Spain
- Belgrade Music Festival, Serbia
- Bratislava Spring Music Festival, Slovakia
- Europaischer Kulturpreis, Austria
- Festival d'Echternach, France
- Festival Napa Valley, United States
- Festival de Villena, Spain
- United Nations WTO Global Youth Tourism Summit, Italy
- Julio Musical, Spain
- Festival Vancouver, Canada
- Koln Musik Triennale, Germany
- Lake Tahoe Music Festival, United States
- Maggio Musicale Fiorentino, Italy
- Montecatini International Opera Festival and Academy, Italy
- Novi Sad Music Festival, Serbia
- Royal Days (Kiralyi Napok), Hungary
- St.Petersburg Palaces Festival, Russia
- Taichung Music Festival, Taiwan
- Tbilisi Piano Fest
- Tuscan Sun Festival, Italy

== Awards ==
- 2006 : Premio Galileo Award for exceptional musical achievement.
- 2008 : Artistic Achievement Award from the Virginia Waring International Piano Competition.
- 2009 : Spirit of Hope Award from the Childhelp Foundation for his acclaimed work with young musicians.
- 2011 : Lupa Di Roma Award (co-recipient) from the Roman City Council.
- 2014 : Premio Civitas, XVIII edition, Pozzuoli
- 2022: Awardee of Italy’s Assoutenti 40th Anniversary Awards for dedication to the development of orchestral music as a cross-cultural tool to promote peace, unity and communication between nations.
- 2023: Ordine della Stella D’Italia distinction conferred by the President of the Italian Republic on the proposal of the Minister of Foreign Affairs for contributing to the worldwide development of classical music education and performance.

== Recordings ==
- 2008: Pictures at an Exhibition and other orchestral works by Modest Mussorgsky (1839-1881), with the Russian National Orchestra on PENTATONE (PTC 5186332), SACD
- 2011: Scheherazade, Capriccio Espagnol and other orchestral works by Nicolai Rimsky-Korsakov (1844-1908), with the Russian National Orchestra on PENTATONE (PTC 5186378), SACD
