= Babs (name) =

Babs is a surname, a given name and a nickname.

== Surname ==
- Alice Babs (Hildur Alice Nilson, 1924-2014), Swedish singer and actress

== Given name ==
- Babs (rapper) (Lynese Wiley, born 1979), American rapper, member of Da Band
- Babs Fafunwa (Aliu Babatunde Fafunwa, 1923-2010), Nigerian educationist, scholar and Minister for Education
- Babs Gonzales (Lee Brown, 1919-1980), American jazz singer
- Babs McMillan, Australian actress
- Babs Olusanmokun, American actor
- Babs Reingold, American artist
- Babs Shanton (1912-1947), Puerto Rican-American performer with the Ziegfeld Follies

== Nickname ==
- Barbra Streisand (born 1942), American singer and actress
- Barbara Windsor (1937-2020), British actress
- Michael Keating (hurler) (born 1944), Irish retired hurling manager and player

== See also ==
- Barbara Graham (1923-1955), American murderer nicknamed "Bloody Babs" by the press
- Babs (disambiguation)
