= UCLA Santa Monica Medical Center =

- UCLA Health

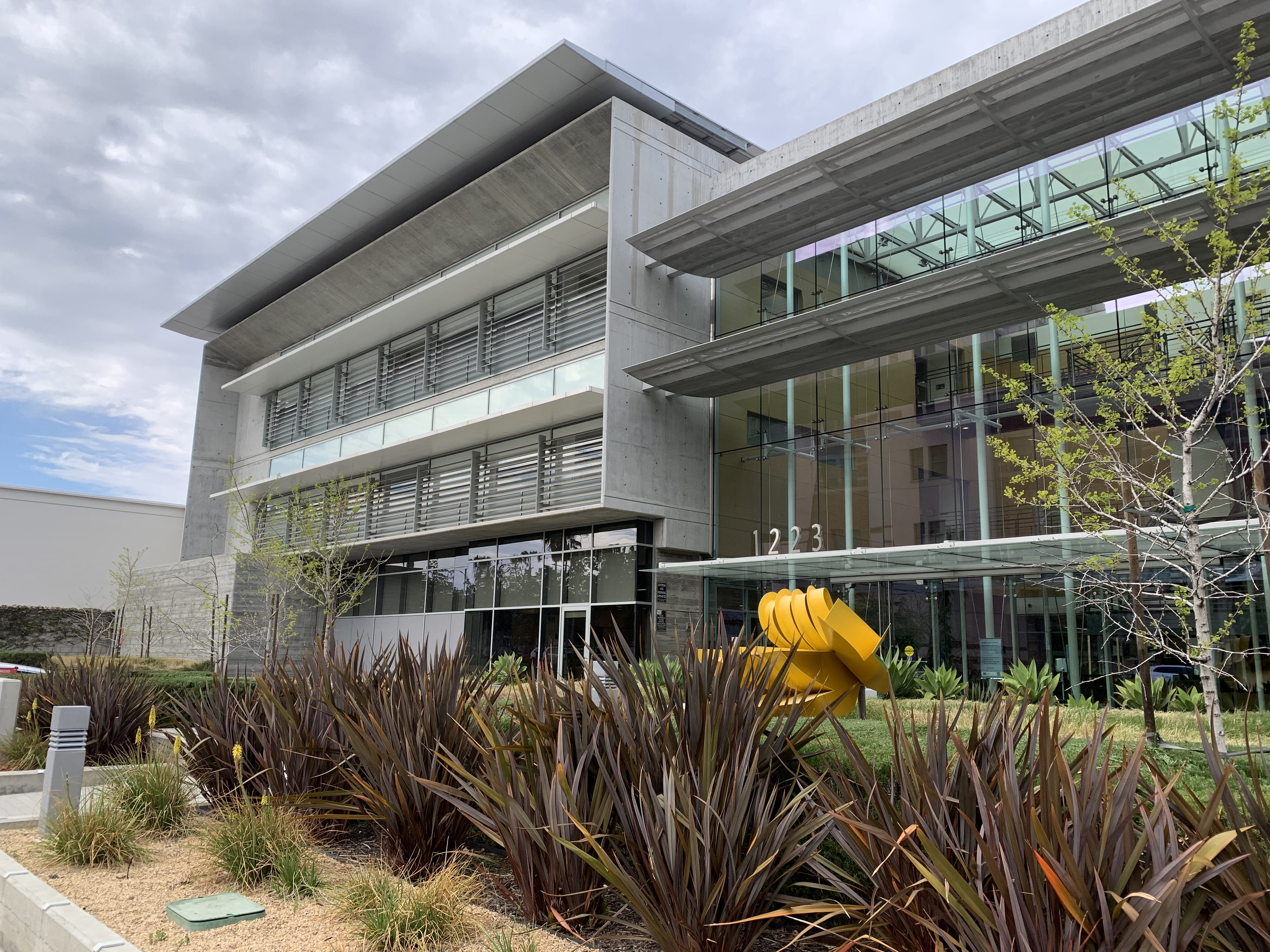

Geography
- Location: Santa Monica, California, United States
- Coordinates: 34.02754°N 118.48659°W

Organization
- Care system: Private, Medicaid, Medicare
- Type: Community
- Affiliated university: University of California, Los Angeles

Services
- Beds: 281

History
- Founded: 1926

Links
- Website: uclahealth.org/santamonica
- Lists: Hospitals in California

UCLA Santa Monica Medical Center is a Teaching hospital located within the city of Santa Monica, California. The hospital was founded in 1926, and is a member of the UCLA Health. The hospital is also known internationally for operating its Rape Treatment Center and the adjoining Stuart House for sexually abused children.

== History ==
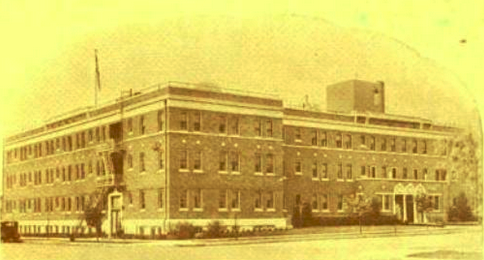
Santa Monica Hospital, circa 1928

The hospital was founded in 1926 by Drs. William S. Mortensen and August B. Hromadka. In 1942, the hospital was acquired by the Lutheran Hospital Society of Southern California, who also owned California Hospital Medical Center. In 1988, it joined UniHealth America.

In 1986, the $36 million six-story Merle Norman Pavilion addition was constructed, which held 107 beds and two thirds of them being private rooms. In 1988, LHS merged with HealthWest, the parent company of Northridge Hospital, to form UniHealth.

In 1995, UCLA Medical Center bought Santa Monica Hospital from UniHealth.

In 2007, the 16,000 square foot Nethercutt Emergency Center was opened and contains 22 beds, named after J.B. Nethercutt.

In 2012, the hospital replacement project was finished which started in 2000 the new replacement wings opened. The tower built in 1967 was torn down and made room for a new courtyard. The north wing and central wing make up of the old tower and the only original building existing is the Merle Norman pavilion which is still in use today.

== Orthopedic hospital ==
The orthopedic practice group at UCLA Santa Monica Medical Center, has been recognized as one of the best orthopedic hospitals in the United States. In 2011, the UCLA Santa Monica Medical Center, opened a new facility next to the existing orthopedic hospital, on 15th Street and Wilshire Blvd.

== Notable births ==
- Shirley Temple, actress and diplomat
- Shannon Lee, actress and martial artist

== Notable deaths ==
- Virginius E. Clark, military aviation pioneer
- Jackie Coogan, actor
- Stan Freberg, voice actor, comedian
- Dick Martin, comedian
- Mehli Mehta, violinist, conductor, orchestra founder, father of Zubin and Zarin
- Tom Petty, rock musician, singer-songwriter
- Gene Roddenberry, creator of Star Trek
- Clark Shaughnessy, American football coach and innovator of the T formation
- Tamara Toumanova, prima ballerina
- Michael Turner, comic book artist
- Glen A. Larson, musician, television producer and director

== See also ==
- UCLA Health
- Ronald Reagan UCLA Medical Center
- David Geffen School of Medicine at UCLA
- Harbor–UCLA Medical Center
- Olive View–UCLA Medical Center
