= Carlos J. Alfonso =

American architect (born 1955)

- Born: March 27, 1955 (age 71); Havana, Cuba
- Education: University of Florida
- Occupations: Architect, Real Estate Executive
- Employer(s): Alfonso Architects, Alliant Partners
- Known for: Former Chairman of University of Florida Board of Trustees (2001-2012) Member of Florida Constitution Revision Commission (1998)

Carlos Juan Alfonso (born March 27, 1955) is a Cuban-American architect and former chairman of the University of Florida Board of Trustees and member of the Florida Constitution Revision Commission. He is a founding principal and president of an architecture firm located in Ybor City, Florida. In addition, he founded Alliant Partners LLC, a commercial real estate investment company. He is CEO of both companies.

== Early life ==
Alfonso was born in Havana, Cuba, in 1955 to Havana architect Carlos Ernesto Alfonso. In 1960, at the age of five, Alfonso fled to the United States with his parents and two younger brothers. He was raised in Tampa, FL and graduated from Jesuit High School in 1973. He received his Bachelor's of Design degree and his Masters of Architecture from the University of Florida in 1981.

== Career ==
Alfonso is a Florida registered architect in Florida and was a Florida registered class A General Contractor.

=== Alfonso Architects ===
Alfonso founded Alfonso Architects, Inc. in 1988 with his father, Carlos Ernesto Alfonso, brother Alberto Alfonso and friend Angel del Monte. Today Alfonso Architects employs approximately 45 people based out of Ybor City, Florida. Their office is located in an 1887 train depot that they restored for use in 1995.

The firm won the Florida A.I.A. Firm of the Year Award in 2003. Recent projects recognized by the State of Florida AIA Design Awards program include design work for Streamsong Resort, Tampa International Airport Airside C, Nielsen Media Research Global Technology Center, The Frank and Carol Morsani Center, the University of South Florida Medical Office Building, Mission of St. Mary Chapel, the University of South Florida School of Psychology building, The Chihuly Collection at the Morean Arts Center and the Tampa Covenant Church.

Alfonso is the firm's CEO and his brother Alberto Alfonso is president and lead designer.

=== Alliant Partners ===
In 2000, Alfonso founded Alliant Partners, LLC, a commercial real estate investment company, and is its CEO. Alliant Partners offers services including property brokerage, schematic site design and planning, property permitting and entitlement, tenant representation, financial underwriting, project scheduling, selection and management of consultants, evaluation of contractor bids, contractor selection, contractor contract negotiations and project construction.

With Alliant, Alfonso has developed properties for entities such as CVS Corporation (formerly Eckerds), Walgreens, Publix, The Home Depot, New York Sports Club, Astoria Federal Savings & Loan, Circuit City, Starbucks Coffee, AT&T Mobility, Mosaic Company, Masonite Door Company, UF Health & Shands, among others.

== University of Florida ==
University of Florida Board of Trustees (2001-2012):

- Founding Member, 2001
- Vice Chair, 2009-2011
- Chairman, 2011-2012

In 2001, after a restructuring of higher education governance, Gov. Jeb Bush appointed Alfonso to be one of the founding 11 members of the UF Board of Trustees. Alfonso sat on the board as a trustee for eight more years and was elected vice chair in 2009, then chairman in early 2011.

Governor Rick Scott reappointed Alfonso to the board in April 2011, and in June he was elected as chairman. After the Florida Senate failed to act on the appointment in session, Scott needed to renominate Alfonso in order for him to finish out his term. Scott used the Senate lapse to reconsider his decision to appoint Alfonso. Alfonso withdrew his application for the position after being informed that Scott would not be reappointing him.

UF President J. Bernard Machen said of Alfonso's 11 years on the board, "He was instrumental in many of the university's greatest achievements during that period, including our increased tuition flexibility, significant progress in innovation and the rapid growth of our campus research infrastructure."

When President Machen resigned, Alfonso was selected as an advisor for the UF Presidential Selection Committee to find his replacement.

Alfonso is the currently the chair of the UF Advisory Board for State of Florida's Online Baccalaureate University, known as "UF Online" and domiciled at the University of Florida.

He also is a current member of the UF Gator Boosters.

== State of Florida ==
Alfonso currently is director of the Florida Council of 100, a vice chair of The Florida Wildlife Foundation; an advisory board member of USAmeriBank, and is the ex-officio trustee member of the UF Foundation's Board of Directors, and on its executive committee.

He previously was on the state of Florida's Constitution Revision Commission (1997-1998); the Florida Communities Trust; the Super Bowl XLIII Board of Directors; the Mercantile Bank Board of Directors; the Florida 2012 Board of Directors, Florida TaxWatch Board of Directors; and the Tampa Bay History Center Board of Directors.

== Awards ==
- 2025 United States Special Operations Command Medal for Outstanding Contributions to Special Operations
- 2014 American Institute of Architects, State of Florida Design Awards – Award of Excellence Mosaic Steamsong Resort Lodge – Streamsong, Florida
- 2014 American Institute of Architects, State of Florida Design Award – Award of Excellence Mosaic Streamsong Resort Clubhouse –Streamsong, Florida
- 2014 Golf, Inc. – Streamsong Resort, U.S. Golf Clubhouse of the Year - 3rd Place
- Distinguished Alumni - University of Florida College of Architecture

== Personal life ==
Alfonso is a commercial multi-engine, instrument rated pilot. Alfonso and his wife, Dorothy, were married in 1988 and have three children: Ariana, Carlos and Isabella. He is a practicing Roman Catholic and registered Republican.
