= Carlos Alfonso =

Carlos Alfonso may refer to:

- Carlos Alfonso (equestrian) (born 1945), Argentine equestrian
- Carlos Alfonso (baseball) (born 1950), Cuban baseball player and manager
- Carlos J. Alfonso (born 1955), Cuban architect
