= Tuscan Sun Festival =

Italian music and lifestyle festival

The Tuscan Sun Festival is an annual music and lifestyle festival in Florence, the capital of Tuscany in Italy. The Independent called the festival “One of the Ten Best Summer Arts Festivals in Europe”.

Described by the International Herald Tribune as "a blend of Mozart and massages, Debussy and Dante, Tchaikovsky, and cuisine", the evening musical programme is balanced with daytime events including art exhibitions and culinary sessions with some of Tuscany’s chefs and winemakers. The Tuscan Sun Festival presents international soloists, conductors and chamber orchestras who perform in Florence's beautiful Teatro della Pergola.

From 2012, the Tuscan Sun Festival also includes a film initiative called Tribeca Firenze. As of February 7, 2013, the official website and this article have had no updates since June 2012 and no indication of a 2013 event.

== History ==
The Tuscan Sun Festival was founded in 2003 by Barrett Wissman, cellist Nina Kotova and writer Frances Mayes, whose bestselling books helped to make Tuscany a popular tourist destination. In its first year, the festival lasted 10 days; in 2004, it expanded to 15. Wissman has since branched the sun festival internationally, with a Festival del Sole beginning in 2006 in Napa Valley.

== Performers ==
Past festivals have included visits and performances by renowned artists such as Piotr Anderszewski, Joshua Bell, The Bolshoi Ballet, José Cura, Stéphane Denève, Anthony Hopkins, Jeremy Irons, Lang Lang, Danielle de Niese, Andrea Marcon and the Venice Baroque Orchestra, Ana Maria Martinez, Gabriela Montero, Anna Netrebko, Antonio Pappano, Robert Redford, Sibylle Szaggars, Giuseppe Tornatore, Angela Gheorghiu, Barry Unsworth, Nina Stemme, Renée Fleming and Pinchas Zukerman. Poet Ed Mayes and painter Alberto Alfonso have exhibited their collaborative works in 2010 and 2011.
