= Festival Napa Valley =

Music, food, wine and lifestyle festival held in California

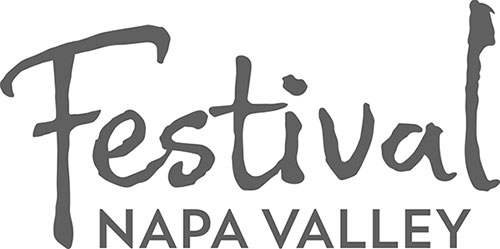
- Genre: Lifestyle festival
- Locations: Napa Valley, California
- Coordinates: 38.3867°N 122.3500°W
- Country: U.S.
- Inaugurated: 2006
- Website: festivalnapavalley.org

Festival Napa Valley is a nonprofit music, arts, wine, and cultural organization based in Napa Valley, California. It presents an annual summer festival and year-round educational and community programs.

Napa Valley Festival Association, a 501(c)(3) nonprofit, governs and produces the Festival. The board includes vintners, arts patrons, and local community leaders, including Robin Baggett, Steven Stull, Darioush Khaledi, and Kathryn Hall. The organization’s programming includes free and low-cost concerts, year-round educational initiatives, and community outreach.

The Festival is funded through ticket revenue, fundraising events, sponsorships, grants, and donor support. A major fundraising component is the Arts for All Gala, which features dining, live performance, and auction items. According to Haute Living, the Arts for All Gala has raised more than $40 million since its inception.

== History ==
Each year, Festival Napa Valley presents over 100 performances and events in Napa Valley and other locations.

In 2014, the festival presented a tribute to Sophia Loren at Far Niente. Loren's son, Carlo Ponti, debuted the Los Angeles Virtuosi Orchestra, an ensemble devoted to the advocacy and support of music education. Whoopi Goldberg emceed the tribute for 400 guests, which included Robert Redford, Francis Ford Coppola and former Speaker of the House Newt Gingrich. Robert De Niro and Former President Bill Clinton sent in tributes via video.

In 2016, the festival presented a tribute to Margrit Mondavi, also at Far Niente. Jazz musician Dave Koz and vocalist Monica Mancini performed. Notable guests included Sophia Loren and Lidia Bastianich. Among those celebrating Ms. Mondavi in person or by video were Beth Nickel, Maria Manetti Shrem, Francis Ford Coppola, Thomas Keller, Jacques Pepin, Boz Scaggs, Piero Antinori, and Lamberto Frescobaldi. The tribute was one of Margrit Mondavi's last public appearances and she died less than six weeks later.

In 2018, the festival feted its Founding Chair Darioush Khaledi and his wife Shahpar, culminating in a private concert and dinner featuring Sarah Chang and Aldo Lopez-Gavilan, hosted by Jeff and Valerie Gargiulo at Gargiulo Vineyards.

In 2021, the festival returned to live programming with a full schedule running from July 16–25, 2021.

In 2026, the festival celebrated its 20th anniversary with a Summer Season featuring performances by artists including Renée Fleming, Wynton Marsalis, Time for Three, Jean-Yves Thibaudet, and Ray Chen, as well as a tribute to tenor Luciano Pavarotti and the world premiere of the opera The Judgment of Paris by Jake Heggie and Gene Scheer.

== Summer Season ==
Festival Napa Valley’s Summer Season, held annually in July, is a multidisciplinary music, art, and culinary festival. The festival features performances across classical and jazz, opera, dance, and contemporary music genres, held in venues across Napa Valley, including Charles Krug, CIA at Copia, Bouchaine Vineyards, Nickel & Nickel, HALL St. Helena, and Castello di Amorosa. Artists who performed at the festival include Renée Fleming, Joshua Bell, Jean-Yves Thibaudet, Tessa Lark, Angel Blue, Tiler Peck, Versailles Royal Opera Orchestra, LMR Jazz Orchestra, and others.

== Arts for All Gala ==
This annual fundraising gala is held at Nickel & Nickel and features a reception, dinner, auction, and a headline concert performance. The 2026 Gala reached a fundraising milestone of $6.5 million. Headlining performers have included Wynton Marsalis, Jon Batiste, Lionel Richie, Carrie Underwood, Trisha Yearwood, Jennifer Hudson, SEAL, Kristin Chenoweth, and Bill Murray, among others.

== Taste of Napa ==
Each summer, the Festival presents Taste of Napa at The Meritage Resort & Spa, its signature food and wine celebration showcasing over 100 local wineries, restaurants, and culinary artisans.

== Educational initiatives ==
The Festival emphasizes education through programs including the Frost School at Festival Napa Valley, Blackburn Music Academy, and Manetti Shrem Opera Program, offering tuition-free training and professional development for more than 90 college and early career professional artists each year. Additional education programs include Novack Concerts for Kids, Bouchaine Young Artist Series, and How I See Music.

== Programs ==
Festival Napa Valley offers community programs including the Festival Napa Valley Community Drumline, MusicTime in the Library, masterclasses for local choir and theater students, and year-round Music and Wellness programming. The annual Music and Wellness Summit featured Daniel Levitin as a keynote speaker in 2025 and Renée Fleming in 2026.

In 2018, Festival Napa Valley awarded more than $1 million to support Napa County public school visual and performing arts programs. The festival has fulfilled teacher "Wish Lists" for classroom resources and materials, has underwritten the creation of Napa County's first-ever arts education master plan in partnership with Arts Council Napa Valley and the Napa Valley Unified School District. Festival grants have provided funding for a district-wide Visual and Performing Arts Coordinator; a music teacher to serve Napa's three largest middle schools; and the creation of a professional development program to encourage arts integration into all classrooms. Festival Napa Valley has also partnered with the Napa County Office of Education to ensure arts education for the county's most disenfranchised students at Camille Creek Community School. On April 5, 2018, We McDonald, a finalist from NBC's "The Voice," inaugurated the Concert on the Green with a performance and question and answer session with the students.

=== Young artist series ===
The festival's Bouchaine Young Artists Series is an admission-free concert series featuring performances by emerging stars.All selected artists receive scholarships underwritten by Tatiana and Gerret Copeland, proprietors of Bouchaine Vineyards.

=== Summer camps ===
In 2018, Festival Napa Valley funded two tuition-free summer camps for the Boys & Girls Clubs' Napa and American Canyon clubhouses, each serving 250 students ages 6–18. The program features a robust arts curriculum designed to encourage students to create, explore and discover, a daily interactive music experience, and attendance at the festival's Concert for Kids featuring a headlining artist.

=== Vocal arts series ===
With support from Festival Napa Valley benefactors Jan Shrem and Maria Manetti Shrem, the festival presents international stars and rising talent on Festival Napa Valley stages each season, including CIA at Copia and Charles Krug Winery.

=== Dance gala ===
Performed each Summer Season, the dance gala has featured dancers from American Ballet Theater, Bandaloop, BODYTRAFFIC, Bolshoi Ballet, Joffrey Ballet, Les Ballets Trockadero de Monte Carlo, National Ballet of Canada, New York City Ballet, Royal Ballet, San Francisco Ballet, StaatsBallett Berlin and Stuttgart Ballet, among others.

Festival Napa Valley was founded in 2006 by arts manager Richard Walker, producer Barrett Wissman, and arts executive Charles Letourneau. The festival was launched with financial support from Ann and Gordon Getty, Tatiana and Gerret Copeland, Maria Manetti and Jan Shrem, Athena and Timothy Blackburn, Peter T. Paul, John Traina, and Robert and Margrit Mondavi, among other noted philanthropists. Founding Partner Wineries included PlumpJack, Darioush, Far Niente, Bouchaine Vineyards, HALL Napa Valley, Peju Winery, Quintessa, Blackbird Vineyards, Castello di Amorosa, Swanson Vineyards, Colgin Cellars, Gargiulo Vineyards, and Robert Mondavi Winery. The founders sought to create a festival that would define Napa Valley as a cultural destination.

== Reception ==
- USA Today ranked Festival Napa Valley among the top 10 music festivals in the United States.
- BBC Music named Festival Napa Valley among the “27 best classical music festivals in USA and Canada 2024”
- Festival Napa Valley was awarded the 2026 Best Of Wine Tourism Regional Award: Wine Tourism Services by Great Wine Capitals.

== See also ==
- Festival del Sole
