= American Youth Symphony =

Youth orchestra in Los Angeles, California (1964–2024)

- Youth orchestra
- Short name: AYS
- Founded: 1964, by Mehli Mehta
- Disbanded: 2024
- Location: Los Angeles, California, U.S.
- Concert hall: Royce Hall, UCLA
- Music director: Mehli Mehta (1964–1998); Carlos Izcaray (2016–2024)

The American Youth Symphony (AYS) was an orchestra based in Los Angeles, California. It was founded in 1964 and disbanded in 2024.

== History ==
AYS was founded in 1964 by the conductor Mehli Mehta (father of Zubin and Zarin Mehta), then Director of the Orchestra Department at UCLA. Mehta led the AYS for 33 seasons, retiring at age 90. In 2016, Carlos Izcaray was announced as the third and last music director in the orchestra's history until the orchestra's disbandment. In March 2024, the AYS announced it had played its final performance on February 25 and would cease operations on March 15. This was due to financial concerns and the lingering effects of the COVID-19 pandemic.

== Training ==
During the 2013–2014 season, the AYS comprised 108 musicians from 26 schools. Training with the AYS was tuition-free and acceptance was competitive. Each season, 250–300 applicants auditioned to fill an average of 30 open positions.

== Programs ==
The AYS performed five to seven concerts each season, the majority of which were presented free to the public at UCLA's Royce Hall. Performances have been described by the Los Angeles Times as possessing "polish and depth". The repertoire included classical masterworks, along with contemporary compositions and film music.

Past guest artists included Sarah Chang, Daníel Bjarnason, Anna Clyne, Johannes Moser, Lera Auerbach, Valentina Lisitsa, David Newman, Alan Silvestri, Charles Fox, Danny Elfman, and John Williams.

=== The Hollywood Projects ===
In May 2012, the AYS launched the multi-year Elfman Project, featuring the scores of composer Danny Elfman and conducted by the Oscar-nominated film composer David Newman.

This project followed a similar three-year exploration of the work of film composer Jerry Goldsmith and served the dual purpose of training young musicians in the art of playing for film and restoring and preserving film scores.

The Elfman Project received attention and praise from the film music community, with Justin Craig of Film Score Monthly writing, "The American Youth Symphony stands high, mastering the challenge of performing film music with all its unconventional meters and rhythms. Don't be deceived by the label of 'youth' orchestra; the AYS is the real deal."

This project was supported by the Los Angeles County Arts Commission, the James Irvine Foundation, and BMI.

== Notable alumni ==
AYS alumni "populate major American orchestras of all stripes and make up significant percentages of most of the major performing ensemble here in Los Angeles." As of 2014, thirteen AYS alumni perform with the Los Angeles Opera, seven with the Los Angeles Chamber Orchestra, and fourteen with the Los Angeles Philharmonic.
