= Nina Kotova =

American cellist (born 1969)

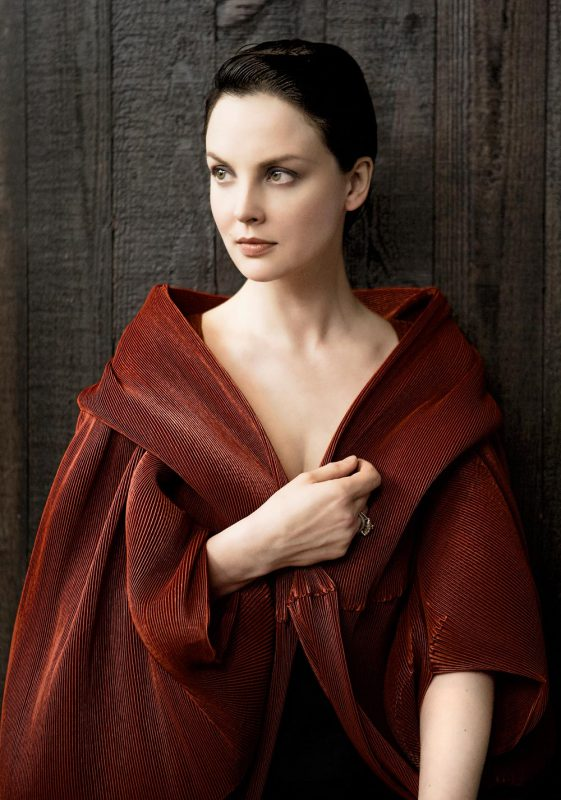
- Kotova, by Lisa Mazzucco
- Born: 11 October 1969 (age 56); Moscow, USSR
- Occupations: Cellist; Musician
- Years active: 1980–present
- Musical career
- Genres: Classical
- Instrument: Cello
- Labels: Philips Classics; Warner Classics; Delos Productions
- Website: ninakotova.com

Nina Kotova (born 11 October 1969) is an American cellist of Eastern European descent. She became a US citizen in 1995. As well as being a versatile artist and an established composer, she is a recording artist who performs both as a soloist with major orchestras and as a chamber musician.

== Early life and education ==
Nina Kotova was born in Moscow. Her father was double bassist Ivan Kotov, who died when she was 15. Kotova began studying at the Moscow Conservatory when she was seven years old, deputed as a soloist with Lalo cello concerto and Prokofiev's Concertino at age 11. At the encouragement of her mother, Nina later studied in Cologne, graduated Cum Laude. When she was 21, Kotova received a scholarship for Yale University but could not afford to study there and moved to New York. She was scouted by a modeling talent scout in 1992.

== Career ==
As a soloist, Kotova made her Western debut at the Smetana Hall in Prague in 1986 with Elgar Cello Concerto and at the Wigmore Hall in 1996, performed at the Barbican Centre, signed contract and released her chart-topping debut album for Philips Classics, and made her Carnegie Hall debut in 1999.

Kotova has toured in recital and as a soloist with major orchestras across the globe, concertizing in Japan, China, the UK, Europe, and the Americas. She has performed at the Concertgebouw and at the Berlin Philharmonic and has collaborated with leading artists and conductors such as Vladimir Jurowski, Jean-Yves Thibaudet, Antonio Pappano, John Malkovich, Hélène Grimaud, Jeremy Irons, Joshua Bell, Lang Lang, Maxim Vengerov, Sarah Chang, Bobby McFerrin, Sting, and many more. She has had the distinction of performing live in broadcast from Red Square in Moscow, for the Imperial family of Japan, and at Buckingham Palace in a special concert for King Charles III.

For ten years, from 2003 to 2013, Nina Kotova owned and played the famous Jacqueline du Pre Stradivarius cello.

As a concert performer, Nina Kotova has been represented by Columbia Artists Management from 1998 to 2001 and by IMG Artists from 2009 to 2013.

In 2011, Kotova received an award for outstanding cultural contribution to Tuscany from the Tuscan-American Association as a co-founder of the Tuscan Sun Festival. She co-founded the Tuscan Sun Festival in 2003 and its sister-festival Festival Del Sole in Napa Valley in 2006 and served as the Artistic Director of the Tuscan Sun Festival (also known as the Festival del Sole) in Cortona, Italy. She is an Artistic co-director of the concert series Domus Artium.

As a professor, Kotova has taught as an Artist in Residence at the University of Texas in Austin, Texas.Ms. Kotova was recently appointed this year as a permanent professor of Violoncello at the prestigious International Academy of Imola in Italy.

Shortly before the fall of the Soviet Union, Kotova defected to the West. In her early twenties, she briefly pursued her second career as a top high fashion model, working with such designers as Emanuel Ungaro, Missoni, Chanel and others for fashion shows and editorial. After she left the government-owned cello in her country, her dream was to own a cello and to begin performing.

In addition to her debut album for Philips Classics, she has recorded the Bloch Schelomo and her own Cello Concerto, the Dvorak Cello Concerto with the Philharmonia Orchestra for Sony, and the Deutsche Grammophon compilation Masters of the Bow, paying homage to the greatest cellists of the last 50 years. She released a recording of the Bach Cello Suites, a recording of Russian sonatas with pianist Fabio Bidini for Warner Classics, Nina Kotova Plays Tchaikovsky recording for Delos Productions with the Tchaikovsky Symphony Orchestra conducted by Vladimir Fedoseyev, «Romantic Recital» with pianist Jose Feghali, Solo Cello album release and "With Affection" album for cello and piano on Delos Productions.

She has been the subject of numerous features in Vogue, Elle, Hello!, Harper's Bazaar, Newsweek, The Sunday Telegraph, 'The Wall Street Journal, 'The New York Post and HuffPost.

She has appeared on the covers of Classic FM Magazine, Classical Music magazine, Gramophone China, Il Venerdi di Repubblica Italia, Record Forum, Reader's Digest, on the Charlie Rose Show, "Breakfast With The Arts", and on Sky Group.

Kotova has worked on music and environmental projects with such actors and artists as Robert Redford, Jeremy Irons, Charles Dance, John Malkovich.

As an artist, Kotova has been featured in the books of several leading photographers such as Arrowsmith: Fashion, Beauty & and Joyce Tenneson Joyce Tenneson: Transformations.

"...Nina is a musician of high seriousness and real talent..." - Time magazine

"...She's a talent to reckon with - poised, committed, graceful and spirited." - Los Angeles Times

"...a strong and individual artist whose depth of feeling and technical control are never in doubt" - Gramophone

== Discography ==
- Nina Kotova - Chopin, Faure, Falla, Glazunov, et al. with the Moscow Chamber Orchestra; Constantine Orbelian, conductor - Philips Records, 1999
- Bloch, Bruch, Kotova: Nina Kotova-Cello Concerto with Philharmonia of Russia; Constantine Orbelian, conductor - Delos Productions, 2002
- Masters Of The Bow - Cello (2 CD) - Deutsche Grammophon, 2003
- Dvorak: Cello Concerto in B minor, Op. 104 with Philharmonia Orchestra; Andrew Litton, conductor - Sony Classical, 2008
- Leshnoff: Cello Concerto, with Chamber Orchestra of Philadelphia; Dirk Brosse, conductor- label: Chamber Orchestra of Philadelphia, 2013
- Bach: 6 Suites for Cello Solo (2 CD) - Warner Classics, 2014
- Rachmaninov - Prokofiev: Cello Sonatas with Fabio Bidini, pianist - Warner Classics, 2017
- Nina Kotova Plays Tchaikovsky with Tchaikovsky Symphony Orchestra; Vladimir Fedoseyev, conductor - Delos Productions, 2017
- A Romantic Recital: Brahms, Reger, Schumann, with Jose Feghali, pianist - Warner Classics, 2021
- Solo Cello - Marais, Hindemith, Schnittke, Bach, Handel, Cassado - Delos Productions, 2023
- 'With Affection' - Chopin, Debussy, Shostakovich, Martinu with Fabio Bidini, pianist - Delos Productions, 2025
