= Alberto Alfonso =

American architect

- Born: Havana, Cuba
- Occupation: Architect
- Awards: 2011 AIA, Award of Excellence; 2011 Archdaily Building of the Year
- Practice: Alfonso Architects
- Buildings: The Chihuly Collection at the Morean Arts Center; Tampa International Airport, Airside C
- Website: alfonsoarchitects.com

Alberto Alfonso AIA is a founding principal and president of Alfonso Architects, an architecture firm located in Ybor City, Florida, United States.

Born in Cuba, Alfonso was educated at the University of Florida where he received his M.A. He founded Alfonso Architects, Inc. with his brother Carlos and partner Angel del Monte.

Alfonso's interest in modernist architecture developed at an early age as he was raised in the house of an architect: his father Carlos E. Alfonso, Sr. Alfonso, Sr. began his career in Havana, Cuba and left the country with his family in 1960 to begin a practice in Tampa, Florida.

Alberto Alfonso received the 1987 Eduardo Garcia Award from the Florida Central chapter of The American Institute of Architects as well as firm of the year in 2003 and 2007. Recent projects recognized by the State of Florida AIA Design Awards program include design work for Tampa International Airport Airside C, Nielsen Media Research Global Technology Center, University of South Florida College of Medicine Center for Advanced Healthcare Frank and Carol Morsani Center, the University of South Florida Medical Office Building, Mission of St. Mary Chapel, the University of South Florida School of Psychology building, The Chihuly Collection at the Morean Arts Center and the Tampa Covenant Church.

The University of South Florida Polytechnic has named Alfonso as executive in residence and interim program development director for architecture and design. In his USF role, Alfonso's responsibilities will include developing the curriculum for the undergraduate program in architecture and design, conducting national and international searches for new incoming facility positions, planning for a study abroad program in France centered on the work of the late master architect Corbusier and developing national and international relationships with other Polytechnic programs.

Alfonso is working in partnership with Santiago Calatrava on designing the new campus for USF Polytechnic in Lakeland, Florida. The bachelor's program in architecture and design at USF Polytechnic is part of the school's strategic plan to expand its programs as it prepares for the opening of its new campus. Alfonso's appointment runs from April 15, 2011, to June 30, 2015.

Alfonso was one of four architects included in the book Four Florida Moderns by Saxon Henry. It includes an analysis of his work by the late New York architect, Charles Gwathmey. Alfonso is also included in 100 Florida Architects and Interior Designers edited by Damir Sinovcic.

Alfonso is an exhibiting painter and has been a featured artist at The Tuscan Sun Festival 2010 and 2011 in Cortona, Italy. In December 2010 Alfonso's paintings were exhibited at The Morean Arts Center, in a collaborative exhibition titled “Painting the Poem, Poeming the Painting.” His other works, including a concrete etching and sculptured metal panels, can be found in the Nielsen Media Global Technology Center, the Mission of St. Mary Chapel, Carmel Café, and Tampa Covenant Church.

== Selected architectural works ==
- Tampa Covenant Church (2010)
- Tampa International Airport Airside C (2005)
- The Chihuly Collection at the Morean Arts Center (2010)
- Nielsen Media Research Global Technology Center (2002)
- University of South Florida Center for Advanced Healthcare Frank and Carol Morsani Center
- University of South Florida School of Psychology building (2005)
- University of South Florida Medical Office Building

== Artwork ==
- Featured artist, The Tuscan Sun Festival
- "St. Francis and the Angel", oil (2009) featured in The Tuscan Sun Festival
- "Prolegomena to Any Future Metamorphoses", 4 in × 4 in (100 mm × 100 mm) watercolor (2010) featured in The Tuscan Sun Festival
- "Man Handling Man Aging", 4 in × 4 in (100 mm × 100 mm) watercolor (2010) featured in The Tuscan Sun Festival
- "And Diego Valasquez", 4 in × 4 in (100 mm × 100 mm) watercolor (2010) featured in The Tuscan Sun Festival

== Publications ==
- Chihuly Collection Presented by the Morean Arts Center, exhibition catalogue. Essay by Alberto Alfonso, AIA (2011)
- 100 Florida Architects and Interior Designers, Edited by Damir Sinovcic(2011)
- Four Florida Moderns, by Saxon Henry, Norton (2010)
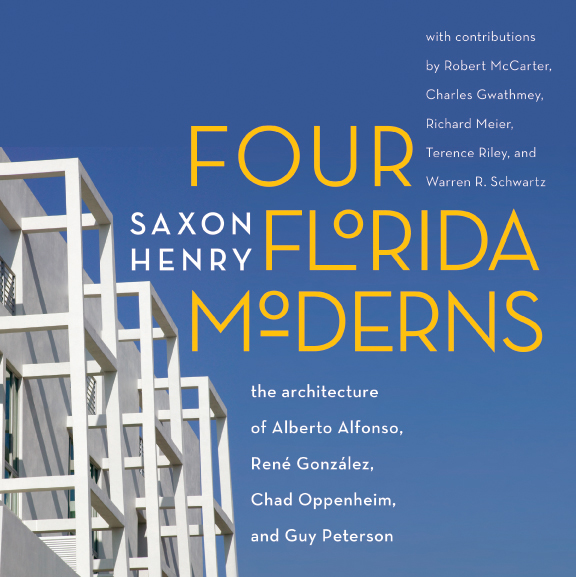
Four Florida Moderns

== Awards ==
- 2011 American Institute of Architects, H. Dean Rowe, FAIA Award for Design Excellence, Tampa Covenant Church
- 2011 American Institute of Architects Tampa Bay Chapter, Merit Award of Excellence, The Chihuly Exhibition at the Morean Arts Center
- 2011 Archdaily Building of the Year, Religious Category Winner, Tampa Covenant Church
- 2010 American Institute of Architects, State of Florida, Award of Excellence for Renovations/Additions, Tampa Covenant Church
- 2008 American Institute of Architects State of Florida Design Honor Award
- 2007 American Institute of Architects, Tampa Bay Chapter Firm of the Year Award
- 2007 American Institute of Architects, State of Florida Merit Award of Excellence, Sam Rampello Downtown School
- 2006 American Institute of Architects, State of Florida Honor Award of Excellence Tampa International Airport - Airside “C”
- 2006 American Institute of Architects, State of Florida Merit Award of Excellence Mission of St. Mary
- 2005 American Institute of Architects, State of Florida Honor Award of Excellence Nielsen Media Research Phase II - Oldsmar, Florida
- 2005 American Institute of Architects, State of Florida Merit Award of Excellence University of South Florida – Psychology/Communication Sciences & Disorders Building
- 2005 American Institute of Architects, Tampa Bay Chapter H. Dean Rowe Award for Design Excellence Mission of Saint Mary
- 2005 American Institute of Architects, Tampa Bay Chapter Design Merit Award Tampa International Airport – Airside "C"
- 2004 American Institute of Architects, State of Florida Design Award of Excellence Nielsen Media Research - Oldsmar, Florida
- 2004 American Institute of Architects, Tampa Bay Chapter Honor Award for Architecture Nielsen Media Research - Oldsmar, Florida
- 2004 American Institute of Architects, State of Florida Design Award of Excellence Photo Tech, Inc. - Sarasota, Florida
- 2004 American Institute of Architects, Tampa Bay Chapter Design Merit Award Photo Tech, Inc.- Sarasota, Florida
- 2004 American Institute of Architects, State of Florida Design Merit Award - Unbuilt Projects Sam Rampello Downtown Partnership School - Tampa, Florida
- 2004 American Institute of Architects, State of Florida Design Merit Award - Unbuilt Projects Mission of Saint Mary - Tampa, Florida
- 2004 American Institute of Architects, Tampa Bay Chapter Design Honor Award - Unbuilt Projects Mission of Saint Mary - Tampa, Florida
- 2003 American Institute of Architects, State of Florida Design Awards Firm of the Year Award
- 2002 American Institute of Architects, State of Florida Design Awards - Unbuilt Projects Nielsen Media Research Florida Campus, Oldsmar, Florida
- 2001 The Planning Commission of Hillsborough County Outstanding Contribution Award - Urban Planning Centro Ybor - Ybor City/Tampa, Florida
- 2001 The Planning Commission of Hillsborough County Outstanding Contribution Award - Historic Preservation/Restoration Centro Español - Ybor City/Tampa, Florida
- 1999 American Institute of Architects, State of Florida Design Awards - Built Projects Tampa Police Department District Offices
- 1998 American Institute of Architects, Tampa Bay Chapter Design Merit Award Jones Residence - Lake Tahoe, California
- 1997 American Institute of Architects, State of Florida Design Awards - Unbuilt Projects Tampa Police Department District Offices
- 1997 American Institute of Architects, State of Florida Design Awards - Unbuilt Projects Hillsborough Community College, Public Service Technology Building, Ybor City Campus
- 1997 American Institute of Architects, Tampa Bay Chapter H. Dean Rowe, FAIA Award of Design Excellence Tampa Police Department District Substation Prototype
- 1997 American Institute of Architects, Tampa Bay Chapter Design Awards Unbuilt Projects Honorable Mention Hillsborough Community College, Public Service Technology Building at the Ybor City Campus
- 1996 American Institute of Architects, Tampa Chapter Design Awards - Built Projects - Honorable Mention Polypack Manufacturing Facility
- 1996 Best of 1996 - Best New Architecture Weekly Planet, Special Edition Polypack Manufacturing Facility
- 1995 American Institute of Architects, State of Florida Design Awards - Built Projects Tampa Museum of Art - Addition, Remodeling and Forecourt
- 1995 Young Architect's Design Award University of Florida, College of Architecture Carlos J. Alfonso and Albert E. Alfonso
- 1994 American Institute of Architects, State of Florida Design Awards - Built Projects The Petrick House - Residential Division
- 1994 American Institute of Architects, State of Florida Design Awards - Unbuilt Projects Tampa Museum of Art - Addition, Remodeling and Forecourt
- 1994 American Institute of Architects, State of Florida Design Awards - Built Projects Ybor Office Building Renovation - Commercial Division
- 1987 American Institute of Architects, Florida Central Chapter Eduardo Garcia Award - Excellence in Architectural Design Albert E. Alfonso, AIA
