= Los Angeles Virtuosi Orchestra =

Orchestra

The Los Angeles Virtuosi Orchestra (also known as LAV) is an instrumental ensemble of professional musicians based in Los Angeles, California, committed to the support and advocacy of music education in schools and the community. LAV supports music education through collaborative partnerships with the community, schools, agencies and other arts organizations and by donating 100 percent of net revenues from its subscription performances to advance music education.

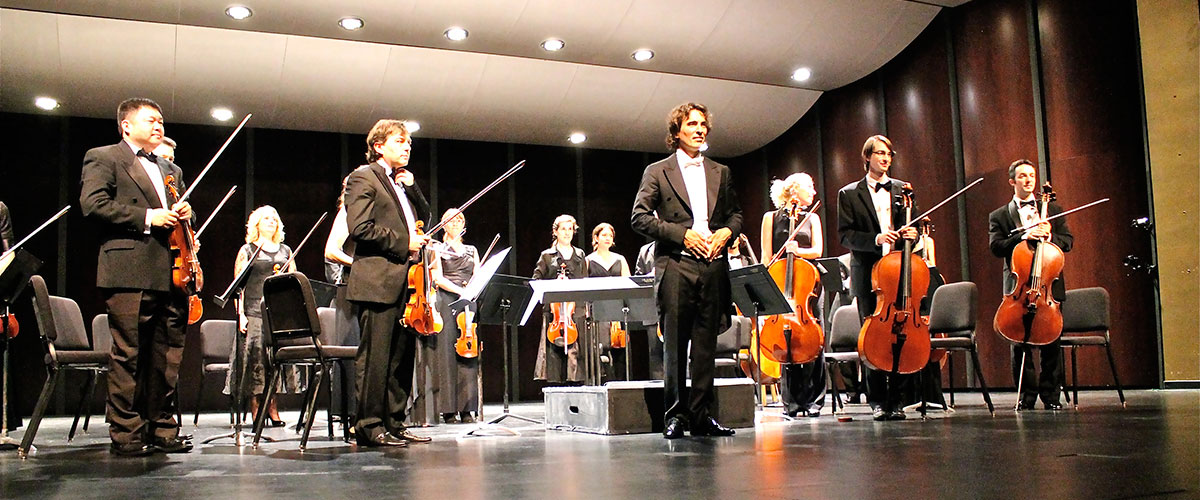
The Los Angeles Virtuosi Orchestra in concert

== History ==
Carlo Ponti founded the orchestra in December 2013.

The ensemble debuted at Napa Valley Festival del Sole in July 2014.

LAV's eleventh concert season (2025–26) is currently being performed in Los Angeles, California under Carlo Ponti, music and artistic director.

== Composition ==
The Los Angeles Virtuosi Orchestra is an orchestra of professional musicians; its sizes ranges from 15 strings to an ensemble of about 50 musicians, depending on the works performed.
