= Morean Arts Center =

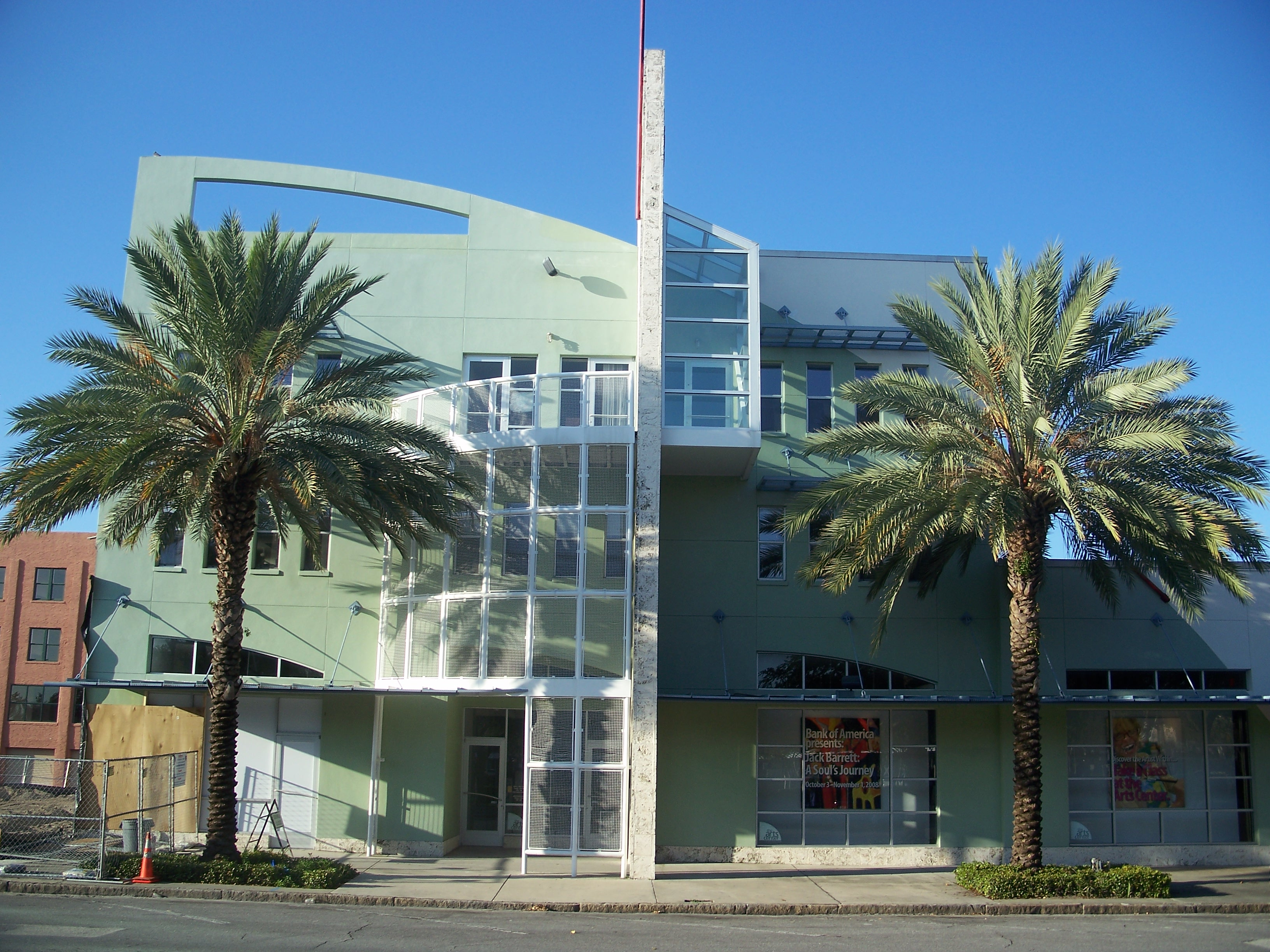

- Location in Florida
- Established: 1917
- Location: 719 Central Avenue; St. Petersburg, Florida
- Coordinates: 27.77120°N 82.64433°W
- Type: Art museum
- Directors: Roger Ross, interim (2016)
- Curator: Amanda Cooper
- Website: www.moreanartscenter.org

The Morean Arts Center (formerly known as The Arts Center) in St. Petersburg, Florida displays works by local, national and international artists. Past displays have included artists' works by Jasper Johns, Duncan McClellan, Allison Massari, Peter Max, Babs Reingold, Águeda Sanfiz, and Jun Kaneko. It also offers art classes. It is located at 719 Central Avenue, with two additional exhibits in St. Petersburg: the Chihuly Collection, located at 720 Central Avenue, and the Morean Center for Clay, located at 420 22nd Street South.

== History ==
Margaret and Edith Tadd founded the Art Club of St. Petersburg in 1917, which eventually grew into the Morean Arts Center. This effort began as a way for the mother and daughter pair to honor Edith’s husband and Margaret’s father J. Liberty Tadd. They wanted to create a space so that artists in their community could be creative, show their work and just appreciate and discuss art.

Located near the kapok tree by what is now the Museum of Fine Arts, the Morean Arts Center began in 1917 as the Art Club of St. Petersburg. It remained there until a merger in 1972 with the Art Center Association, where it moved to 7th Street and took on the new name The Arts Center. After 20 years, thanks to a donation from Beth Morean, the Arts Center was able to purchase and connect multiple properties on the 700 block of Central Avenue, which is where it resides today as the Morean Arts Center.

=== Glass Studio and Hot Shop ===
The Bank of America Children’s Learning Center is located at the Morean as well as the Glass Studio & Hot Shop. The latter provides working space for glass artists, audience seating to watch glassblowing in action, and teaching facilities for studio classes and workshops. Visitors can also try glassblowing themselves and purchase original glass art created by local and regional artists in the Hot Shop retail store.

=== Chihuly Collection ===
In 2010, Dale Chihuly agreed to work with the Morean Arts Center on setting up an exhibition of his work. The building was originally located on Beach Drive, but moved in 2016 to Central Avenue (next door to the Morean Arts Center building). This partnership began as Chihuly loved the opportunity to use his collection for educational purposes for the Morean Arts Center artists and community. It’s thanks to this addition that the Morean Arts Center was able to open the Morean Glass Studio. According to the center website, “the proceeds from the Chihuly Collection supported the local arts community.” This partnership has enabled the Morean Arts Center to not only thrive, but to give more opportunities to artists in the community to study, learn, and showcase their art.

=== The Morean Center for Clay ===
The Morean Center for Clay moved to a renovated space at the Historic Train Station in 2009. Built as the Seaboard Train Station in 1926, this historic building now houses studios for 42 working artists, 6 Artists-in-Residence, two rotating galleries, classrooms, and a 3,500 square feet (330 m^{2}) event space. On the grounds, there is a large kiln complex, complete with: four wood kilns, two gas kilns, and a soda kiln. Visitors are welcome to tour the facility, Tuesday through Saturday. There are also hands-on activities and historic tours available by appointment only. The building includes a retail store with a wide variety of Chihuly merchandise. In August 2016, the collection relocated from 400 Beach Drive to 720 Central Avenue, adjacent to the Morean Arts Center.

== Programs ==
The Morean offers adult, kids’, family, early childhood, and summer camp programs, attracting beginners and advanced students alike. Primary outreach programs are geared towards youth-many of whom are at risk. Art classes in clay, glass, and many other mediums are offered, along with many programs for children and adults to come together as a community and learn about art.

=== Operation: Art of Valor ===
The Operation: Art of Valor program began in 2018 and is run with the partnership of James A. Haley Veterans’ Hospital. This is a free program for veterans that provides classes in glass blowing, photography, and most recently-added ceramics; this is a program that gives veterans a chance to learn creative skills and build confidence and teamwork skills.

=== Memory Mornings ===
Memory Mornings is offered once a month on a specified date and allows visitors and their caretakers to view the Chihuly Collection before it opens. It not only includes a free tour of the Chihuly Collection, but also includes an art activity for the visitors and caretakers inspired by the collection.

== Glass robbery ==
On the morning of February 8, 2016, employees at the Chihuly Collection found that a small piece, Cobalt and Lavender Piccolo Venetian with Gilded Handles, had been stolen. The piece is valued at $25,000. The next morning the vessel was dropped off in the entryway of the Morean Arts Center; it had been wrapped in bubble wrap and placed in a box.

== Creating virtually ==
The Morean Arts Center has its own YouTube Channel: Morean Arts Center with creation prompts for artists, virtual tours hosted by assistant curators, and videos advertising current exhibits, resident artists, and offerings.
