= Johns Hopkins All Children's Hospital =

Hospital in St. Petersburg, Florida, US

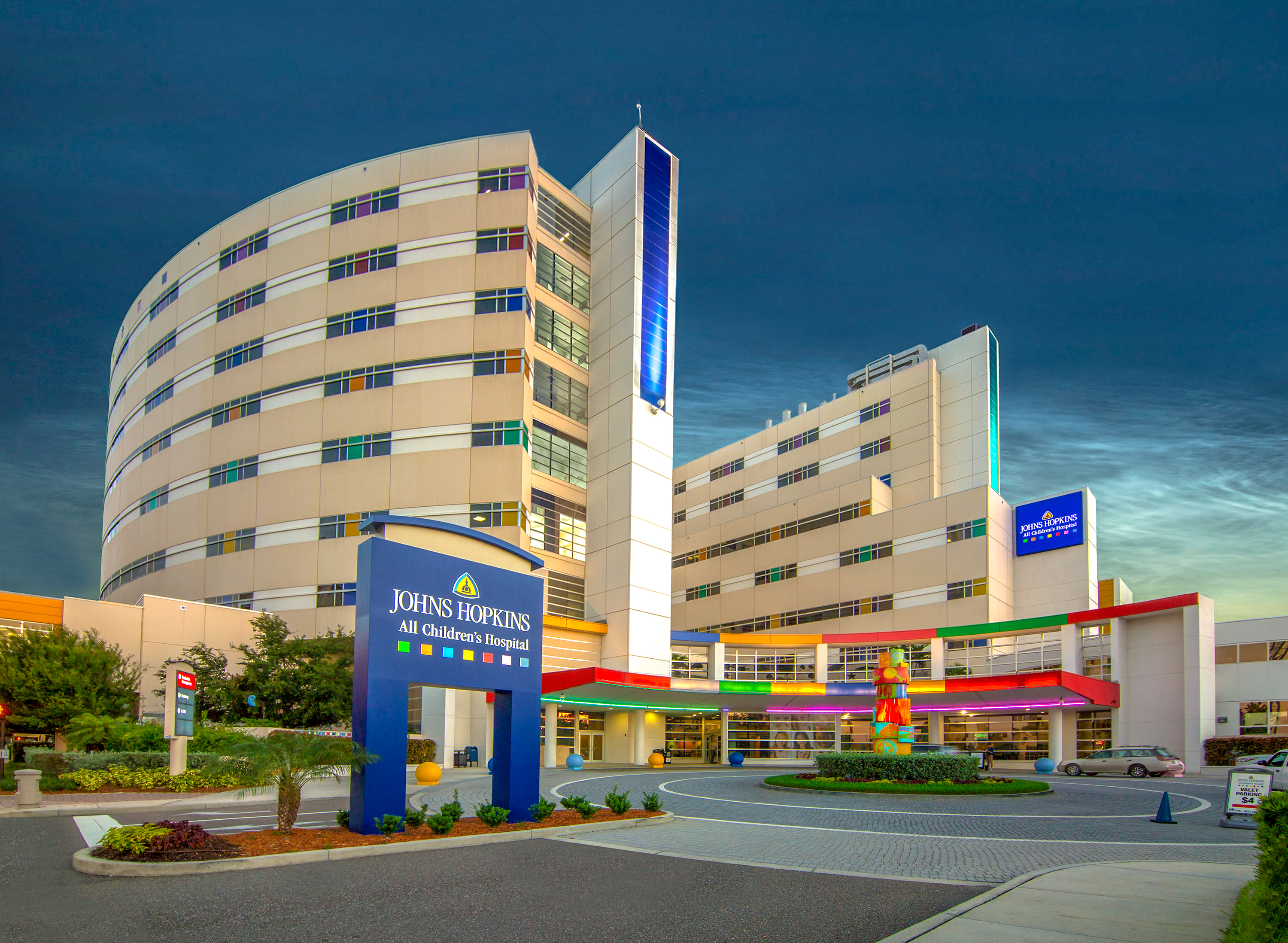
- Johns Hopkins All Children's Hospital

Geography
- Location: 501 6th Ave. S, Saint Petersburg, Florida, United States
- Coordinates: 27.764495°N 82.640584°W

Organization
- Type: Teaching
- Affiliated university: Johns Hopkins School of Medicine

Services
- Emergency department: Level I Pediatric Trauma Center
- Beds: 259 licensed beds
- Specialty: Pediatrics and pediatric subspecialties

Helipads
- Helipad: FAA LID: FL14
Number	Length		Surface
Number	ft	m	Surface
H1	54 x 54	16 × 16	rooftop

History
- Former names: American Legion Hospital for Crippled Children; All Children's Hospital
- Constructed: Current building: 2005
- Founded: Original: 1926; Current: 2010

Links
- Website: www.hopkinsallchildrens.org
- Lists: Hospitals in Florida

Johns Hopkins All Children's Hospital, formerly All Children's Hospital, is a pediatric acute care children's hospital located in St. Petersburg, Florida. The hospital has 259 beds and is affiliated with the USF Morsani College of Medicine and Johns Hopkins University School of Medicine. The hospital provides comprehensive pediatric specialties and subspecialties to pediatric patients aged 0–21 throughout western Florida. Johns Hopkins All Children's Hospital also features a Level I Pediatric Trauma Center.

In 2011, All Children's Hospital became the first center outside the Baltimore-Washington, D.C., area to integrate with the Johns Hopkins Health System. In 2016, it officially took the name Johns Hopkins All Children's Hospital.

== History ==
Johns Hopkins All Children's Hospital was founded in 1926 as the American Legion Hospital for Crippled Children to care for children with polio and other crippling disorders without regard for race, creed or ability to pay. In 1934, Lloyd Gullickson partnered with Babe Didrikson in a charity golf match against Glenna Collett-Vare and Babe Ruth which they won quite easily. The match raised $600 for the hospital. A number of gallery members were betting which of the "Babes" would hit the longest drive on each hole.

From 1936 to 1960, the hospital expanded by more than 5,000 square feet, adding physical therapy, educational therapy, surgical facilities, a full-time school teacher, a library, and school facilities. As the threat of polio decreased, hospital leaders planned for a future that included a wider variety of services. Construction began on the new facility in 1965 on land acquired from the City of St. Petersburg.

The new hospital opened its doors in 1967 with the new name All Children's Hospital. The name was based on a quote by Carl Sandburg, which states "There is only one child in all the world, and that child's name is all children."

In 2005, All Children's broke ground on construction of a 240-bed hospital and adjoining outpatient facility. This facility opened in 2010. It consisted of a 10-floor hospital and a seven-floor outpatient care center. In 2011, All Children's Hospital joined the Johns Hopkins Health System as a fully integrated member of Johns Hopkins Medicine.

In 2016, the organization changed its name to Johns Hopkins All Children's Hospital and celebrated its 90th anniversary. Also in 2016, it broke ground on a $95-million Research and Education Building, which will become home to the institutes, house a new pediatric biorepository, provide lab and simulation training space, and encourage collaboration among clinicians, researchers, faculty and trainees. It will open in the fall of 2018.

In addition to the outpatient care center in St. Petersburg, the hospital has outpatient locations along Florida's west coast in Brandon, East Lake, Fort Myers, Lakeland, North Port, Pasco, Sarasota, South Tampa and Tampa.

== About ==
Johns Hopkins All Children's has 11 outpatient care centers in six counties on Florida's west coast and affiliations and collaborations with community and regional hospitals where Johns Hopkins All Children's physicians and protocols have direct impact on patient care.

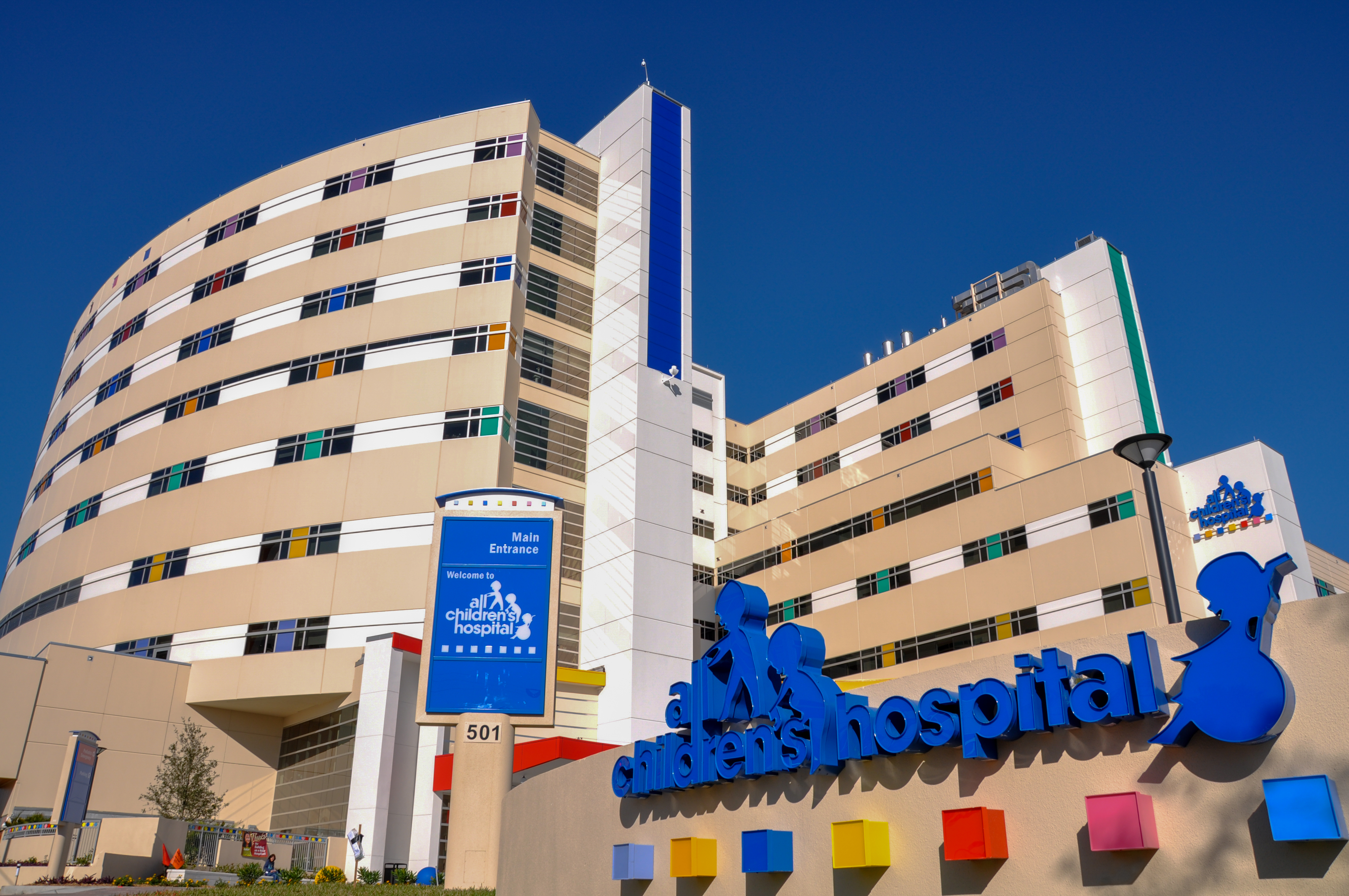
View of the hospital before the name change.

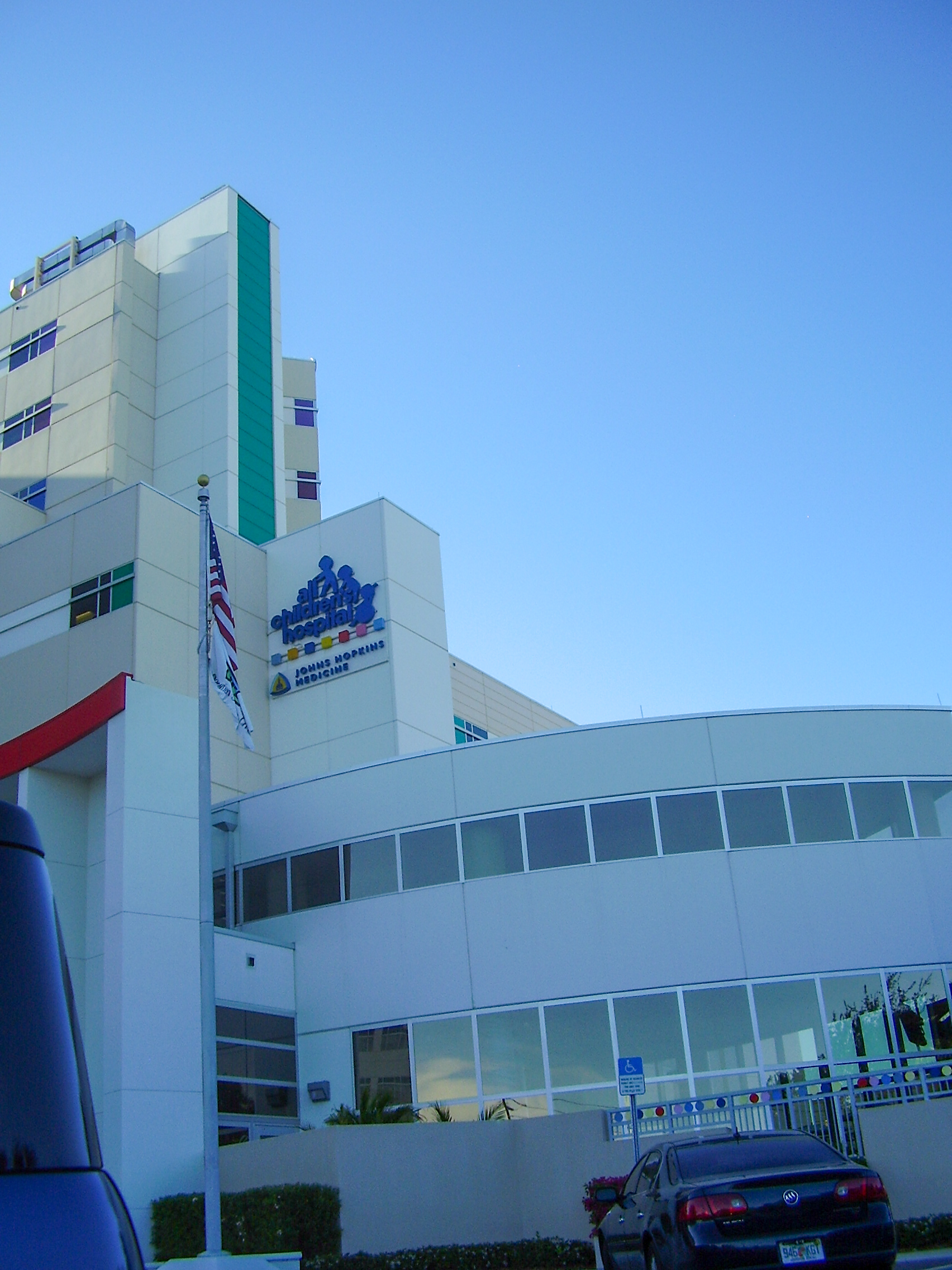
Another view of the hospital.

An exclusive affiliation with AdventHealth Tampa that started in 2016 allows doctors from All Children's Specialty Physicians to provide pediatric care in cardiology, critical care, endocrinology, hematology/oncology, hospital medicine, general surgery, neonatology and pulmonology at that hospital. Several other AdventHealth locations in Pasco, Hillsborough and north Pinellas counties follow Johns Hopkins All Children's clinical pediatric protocols in their emergency centers. Johns Hopkins All Children's also collaborates with such hospitals as Sarasota Memorial, Brandon Regional, St. Petersburg General and others to provide specialty care to their patients. A collaboration with IMG Academy brings Johns Hopkins All Children's sports medicine and general health services to the academy's campus in Bradenton, Florida.

As a regional referral center for children, Johns Hopkins All Children's Hospital draws patients from throughout Florida, all 50 states and 36 foreign countries. It is one of four pediatric trauma centers in the state of Florida.

== Controversies ==
=== Heart surgery mortality ===
In November 2018 it was revealed that the mortality rate in its pediatric heart surgery program was very high. Surgeons in the program had lost needles in two infants’ chests and infection rates of patients spiked. The problems started after the departure of program leader Dr. James Quintessenza after hospital officials had disputes with him. The surgeons that were hired to replace Quintessenza were lackluster in their techniques and mortality rates tripled in a period of two years. Hospital officials decided to send complicated cardiac cases to other hospitals, but even routine cases also had very high mortality rates. After years of cover ups, officials at Johns Hopkins in Baltimore fired many top level hospital officials and the surgeons involved. After a detailed investigation in 2019, the Florida Department of Health fined the institution $804,000. The fine was the most any Florida hospital had ever received. The hospital has also settled with some of the 11 families affected by the program totaling around $40 million. Administrators have announced that the hospital will implement new policies and structural changes to address the core issues that allowed the troubled heart program to continue. The hospital has since started to rebuild by hiring back Quintessenza, and hiring other respected pediatric cardiothoracic surgeons.

=== Maya Kowalski ===
In October 2016, 10-year-old Maya Kowalski presented to the emergency department at All Children's Hospital with severe symptoms of complex regional pain syndrome (CRPS), a condition of which Maya was previously diagnosed with. Doctors from the hospital did not understand Maya's condition and believed that medicines prescribed from unaffiliated doctors were too extreme. Doctors at the hospital suspected Maya was being medically abused by her mother, Beata Kowalski, as a symptom of Munchausen by proxy. Medical staff subsequently filed a report to the Florida child abuse hotline and took custody of Maya, forcibly barring Maya from seeing her parents. After multiple months without access, Beata committed suicide.

In late September 2023, a lawsuit by Maya Kowalski's father, Jack Kowalski, went to trial on behalf of Maya Kowalski, seeking $220 million in damages. The lawsuit accused the hospital of imprisoning Maya in state custody and withholding contact from her parents for a period of three months, accused a hospital social worker of sexual abuse, and mental and psychological abuse by hospital staff during her 3-month stay at All Children's.

On November 9, 2023, a Florida jury found in favor of the Kowalski family and awarded them $261 million in damages after 3 days of deliberations. The damages ordered to pay was later reduced to $213.5 million by a judge, who rejected a motion for a retrial. This lawsuit was documented in Take Care of Maya, released on Netflix in June of the same year. In October 2025, a Florida appeals court overturned the entire verdict, clearing the pathway to a new trial.

== Awards ==
As of 2020–21, Johns Hopkins All Children's Hospital has placed nationally in all 8 out of 10 ranked pediatric specialties on U.S. News & World Report: Best Children's Hospital rankings. In addition, the hospital is ranked as the best children's hospital in Florida.

2021 U.S. News & World Report Rankings for Johns Hopkins All Children's Hospital
Specialty	Rank (in the U.S.)	Score (out of 100)
Neonatology	#44	79.0
Pediatric Cancer	#41	72.7
Pediatric Diabetes & Endocrinology	#33	69.0
Pediatric Nephrology	#39	68.0
Pediatric Neurology and Neurosurgery	#27	78.9
Pediatric Orthopedics	#50	61.9
Pediatric Pulmonology & Lung Surgery	#47	70.3
Pediatric Urology	#46	51.4

== See also ==
- List of children's hospitals in the United States
- Johns Hopkins Children's Center
- USF Morsani College of Medicine
