= University of South Florida College of Medicine =

Public medical college in Tampa, Florida, US

University of South Florida Morsani College of Medicine
- Type: Public university
- Established: 1971
- Dean: Charles J. Lockwood
- Faculty: 858
- Administrative staff: 215
- Students: Medicine: 734 M.D. School of Basic Biomedical Sciences: 78 M.S. and 83 Ph.D. School of Physical Therapy and Rehabilitation Sciences: 146 DPT; Physician Assistant: 99 PA
- Location: Tampa, Florida, U.S.
- Campus: Urban
- Colors: Green and Gold
- Nickname: Bulls
- Mascot: Rocky D. Bull
- Website: health.usf.edu/medicine/

University of South Florida Morsani College of Medicine is one of the graduate schools of the University of South Florida.

It is located in north Tampa, Florida and serves the greater Tampa Bay Area. Established by the Florida Legislature in 1965, the college enrolled its charter class in 1971.

== Teaching Affiliates ==
Tampa General Hospital is the primary teaching hospital and chief academic partner for the Morsani College of Medicine, as well as the larger USF Health system.

Other teaching affiliates include:

- H. Lee Moffitt Cancer Center & Research Institute; the primary cancer affiliate for the school
- James A. Haley Veterans’ Hospital in Tampa, Florida
- Bay Pines Veterans’ Affairs Healthcare System
- Johns Hopkins All Children’s Hospital in St. Petersburg, Florida
- Morton Plant Hospital

== Clinical Research ==
The College faculty runs interdisciplinary research programs on brain disease and repair, such as Alzheimer's disease, Parkinson's disease, and Stroke; aging studies; Cardiovascular disease; children's health; Patient safety; Cell therapy; and Infectious disease & Biodefense.

The USF campus is home to two major research facilities. H. Lee Moffitt Cancer Center & Research Institute, a four-story, 101,352-square-foot (9,415.9 m^{2}) building, was dedicated in October 1995. In 2003, Moffitt opened the new Moffitt Clinic and Vincent A. Stabile Research Building, dramatically increasing USF Health's research and outpatient clinical space. Additionally, there is another research building adjacent to the University of South Florida College of Medicine which provides 50,542 square feet (4,695.5 m^{2}) of laboratory, research, classroom, and office space.

The USF Children's Research Institute, opened in 2000, is a $12 million research building in partnership with All Children's Hospital in St. Petersburg, Florida.

== Advanced Healthcare at USF Health ==
Center for Advanced Medical Learning and Simulation (CAMLS)

- 35 surgical skills stations, including microsurgery,
- Endoscopic and image-guided surgery
- Trauma and hybrid operating room suites
- 200-seat auditorium of the future
- Virtual clinic, hospital, and pharmacies
- Research and innovation laboratory
- Multi-specialty robotics surgery training
- Audio-video recording of team training performance for debriefing

USF Physicians Group made 273,122 inpatient and 276,122 outpatient visits in 1999–2000. Due to the demands from the growing patient population in Tampa Bay Area, USF Health is investing $105 million to develop a health care system using state of the art technology to improve health care management. The latest technology also serves a dual purpose as it facilitates professional health education with USF Health students employing team-based learning.

The Carol and Frank Morsani Center for Advanced Health Care is located at the corner of Holly Avenue and Magnolia Avenue in north Tampa, Florida adjacent to the USF Health Campus. It is a six-story structure designed by architect Alberto Alfonso with 194,400 square feet (18,060 m^{2}). Its features include entirely digital Diagnostic Imaging Center including women's diagnostics with mammography, Ambulatory Center with eight operating rooms and five endoscopy suites, Outpatient Facilities with 60 clinical exam rooms, Clinical and translational research, Patient Outreach and Education Center as well as a Pharmacy. The building will have distinct clinical spaces for Brain Health (including Neurosurgery), Neurology and Psychiatry, Gastroenterology, Otorhinolaryngology, Sports Medicine, and Women's Health.

The Morsani Center's most distinct feature is called the One Stop Healthcare which aims to bring services including x-rays, MRIs, and labs to the patient. As a result, the patient is spared from scheduling multiple appointments at multiple locations for their annual exam. All of the patient's needs are taken care of during one visit. Furthermore, the center also stores all the health records electronically which ensures that the patient will be able to request appointments, send email messages to doctors, and request prescriptions online.

The South Tampa Center is located at the Tampa General Hospital campus on Davis Island in south Tampa, Florida. The South Tampa Center is the smaller of the two centers as it is a seven-story structure with 126,000 square feet (11,700 m^{2}). Its features, similar to the Morsani Center, include entirely digital Diagnostic Imaging Center including women's diagnostics with mammography, Outpatient Facilities with 90 clinical exam rooms, Clinical and translational research, as well as a Patient Outreach and Education Center. The building will have distinct clinical spaces for Pediatrics, Brain Health (including Neurosurgery), Neurology and Psychiatry, Cardiology, Dermatology, General Surgery, Vascular Surgery, Gastroenterology, Internal Medicine, and OB-GYN.

The Advanced Healthcare at USF Health is also making an effort towards Holistic Health. The educational focus of the two centers are to teach students at USF Health to focus on the patient's overall well-being. Since USF Health is a conglomerate of College of Medicine, College of Nursing, College of Pharmacy, and College of Public Health, the two centers will focus on the entire continuum of health from birth to end-of-life issues.

== USF Health Libraries ==
USF Health Libraries consist of two locations: Shimberg Health Sciences Library, located on the USF Health campus in Tampa and the Florida Blue Health Knowledge Exchange, located in the Morsani College of Medicine building in downtown Tampa.

Founded in 1971, the Hinks & Elaine Shimberg Health Sciences Library serves the Morsani College of Medicine at the University of South Florida, the University of South Florida College of Nursing, the University of South Florida College of Public Health, and the University of South Florida Taneja College of Pharmacy.

The first floor houses the circulating collection, reserves collection, and the computer lab. A new expanded 24/7 study space will open as soon as renovations are completed. The space includes new furniture, white boards, and electrical outlets. The old 24/7 space now houses new furniture and will become a group space for the library. Both of these areas are only accessible through swipe card access. The second floor is a quiet study area where the conference rooms are located (available for checkout at the Circulation Desk) as well as the home of the large print journal collection.

== Notable alumni ==
- David Mendelblatt, yachtsman and ophthalmologist
