= Tampa Covenant Church =

Church in Lake Magdalene, Florida, US

Coordinates: 28.06868°N 82.49293°W

Tampa Covenant Church is an Evangelical Presbyterian Church (EPC) in Lake Magdalene, Florida. The building was designed by Alberto Alfonso and chosen by Arch Daily for a 2010 building of the year award in the religious category.
