= Mehli Mehta =

Indian conductor and violinist

- Born: 25 September 1908; Bombay, British India
- Died: 19 October 2002 (aged 94); Santa Monica – UCLA Medical Center, Santa Monica, California
- Education: University of Bombay; Trinity College of Music in London (licentiate, 1929)
- Occupations: violinist, conductor
- Known for: founded, Bombay Symphony Orchestra (1935); founded, Bombay String Quartet (1940); founded American Youth Sym. Orch. (1964)
- Spouse: Tehmina Daruvala (m. ca 1935)
- Children: Zubin Mehta; Zarin Mehta
- Website: Mehli Mehta Music Foundation

Mehli Mehta (25 September 1908 – 19 October 2002) was an Indian conductor and violinist.

== Early life ==
Mehta was born in Bombay, India to a Parsi family. His involvement in music stemmed from his birth. As a young violinist his main musical influence and inspiration was Jascha Heifetz. A pioneering figure in the Indian musical world, he founded the Bombay Symphony Orchestra in 1935, and was its Concertmaster (1935–1945) and conductor (1945–1955). He was married to Tehmina.

== Performing career ==
In 1940 Mehta founded the Bombay String Quartet. He spent five years in New York City studying with eminent violin pedagogue Ivan Galamian, and earned degrees from the University of Bombay and Trinity College of Music in London.

He moved to the United States in 1945, where he studied violin in New York. In 1955 Mehli Mehta moved to England, where he served for five years as Assistant Concertmaster and Concertmaster of the Hallé Orchestra of Manchester under Sir John Barbirolli. Mehta came to regard Barbirolli as "one of the greatest influences of my conducting life."

In 1959 he joined the Curtis Quartet of Philadelphia and toured with them across the United States for the next five years. In later years he was to state, "the string quartet has been the prime, basic factor of my entire musical philosophy." He then moved to Los Angeles and was Director of the Orchestra Department at UCLA (1964 to 1976).

Within two months of his arrival in 1964, he organised the American Youth Symphony with students from all the universities in Los Angeles. Under his dedicated leadership the orchestra grew to its current size of 110 young musicians, ages 16–27, from all over Los Angeles and the surrounding areas. He conducted the orchestra at the twelve-hour Beethoven Marathon in a performance of a Beethoven symphony on Beethoven's 200th birthday, 16 December 1970, in the Dorothy Chandler Pavilion, a concert at which his son, Zubin Mehta, also conducted. He led the orchestra until its 34th season in 1998.

In his biography of Barbirolli, author Michael Kennedy quotes the great conductor as saying, "I... attended Mehli's concert with the American Youth Symphony. I am glad I did, for dear Mehli was magnificent. Made those children play really quite splendidly. I was really thrilled and impressed."

Mehta was highly acclaimed when he appeared as conductor with the Philadelphia Orchestra in 1978, 1980, 1982 and 1984. In addition, he conducted the RIAS Berlin, Israel, Tokyo, Yokohama, Jerusalem, Venezuela and Brazil Symphonies; the Israel Sinfonietta; and the symphony orchestras of San Antonio, Grand Rapids, Milwaukee, Miami, Puerto Rico, Rhode Island, Jacksonville, Memphis, Ashland and Eugene. In March 1983, he made his New York debut at Carnegie Hall to unanimous acclaim with the National Orchestra Association Symphony.

Mehta was the recipient of the Governor's "Award for the Arts" of the California Arts Council: the "Magnum Opus Award" of the University of Southern California; the American String Teachers Award; the Award of Merit from the Mayor and Council of Los Angeles; and the Zoroastrian Association of California's Honorable Award. Mehta was under the management of ICM Artists Ltd., New York.

Mehli Mehta died in Santa Monica, California on 19 October 2002, aged 94.

== Legacy ==
Mehta's son, Zubin, is a well-known classical music conductor. His other son, Zarin, was the executive director of the New York Philharmonic and was previously the executive director of the Montreal Symphony as well as the Ravinia Festival in Chicago.
