= University of Florida Board of Trustees =

University governing body

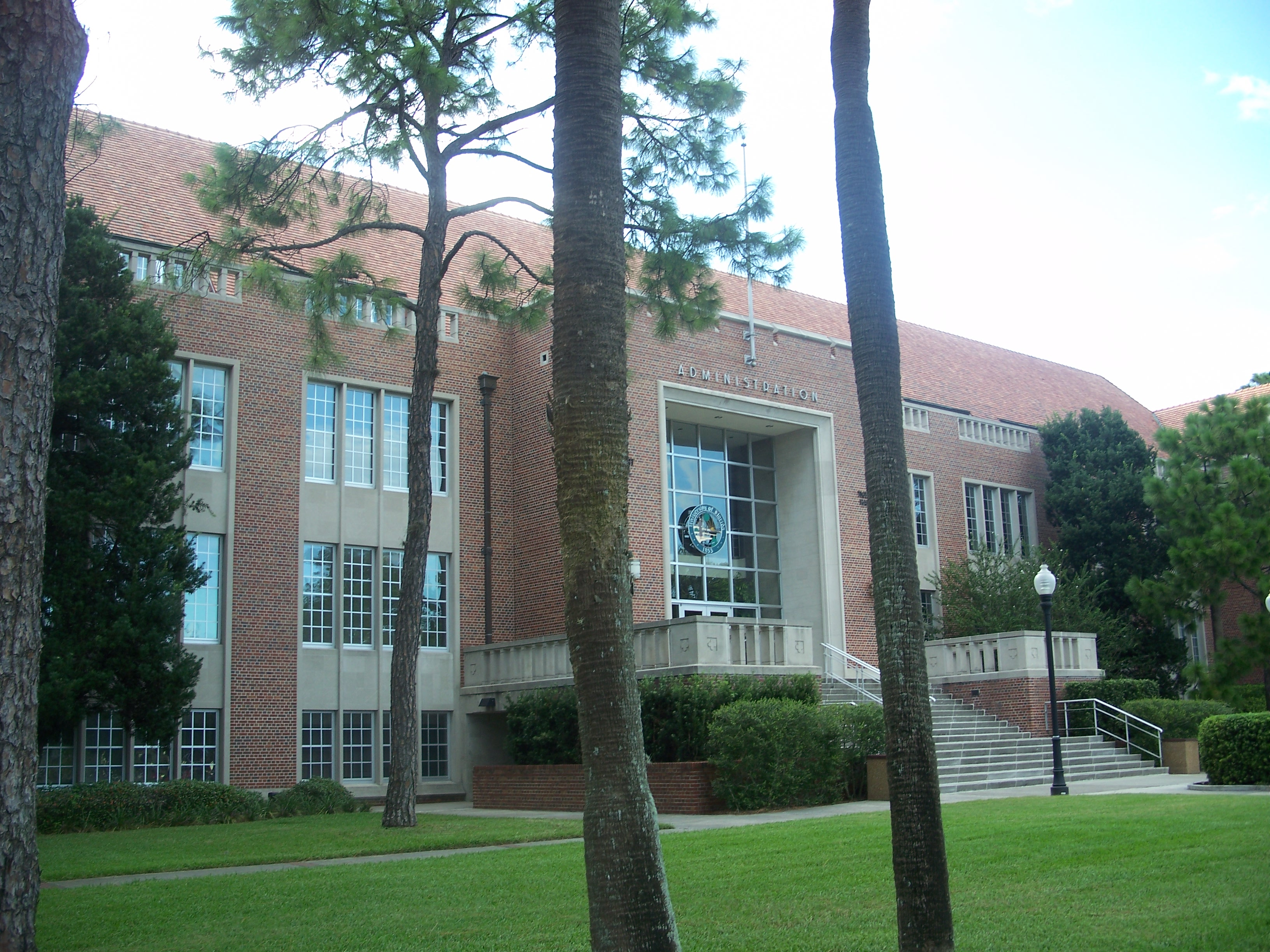
- Tigert Hall
- Formation: 2003
- Type: Governing Board
- Headquarters: Gainesville, Florida
- Location: United States
- Chair: Mori Hosseini
- Website: trustees.ufl.edu

The University of Florida Board of Trustees is the governing body of the University of Florida and a member of the State University System of Florida. The University is located in Gainesville, Florida, United States. The current Chair of the Board is Mori Hosseini.

According to the official website, "The Board of Trustees is the public body corporate of the university. It sets policy for the institution, and serves as the institution's legal owner and final authority. The UF Board of Trustees holds the institution's resources in trust and is responsible for their efficient and effective use. The UF Board of Trustees consists of six citizen members appointed by the Governor and five citizen members appointed by the Board of Governors. The Chair of the Faculty Senate and the President of the Student Body are also voting members."

== Composition ==
- Mori Hosseini (Chairman)
- Rahul Patel (Vice Chairman)
- David Brandon
- Matthew Bravo (Student Body President)
- Richard Cole
- Chris Corr
- Jed Davis
- ‌Dr. Luisa Amelia Dempere (Faculty Senate Chair)
- Bill Heavener
- Dan O'Keefe
- Marsha Powers
- Fred Ridley
- Patrick Zalupski
