= Babs Shanton =

American performer (1912–1947)

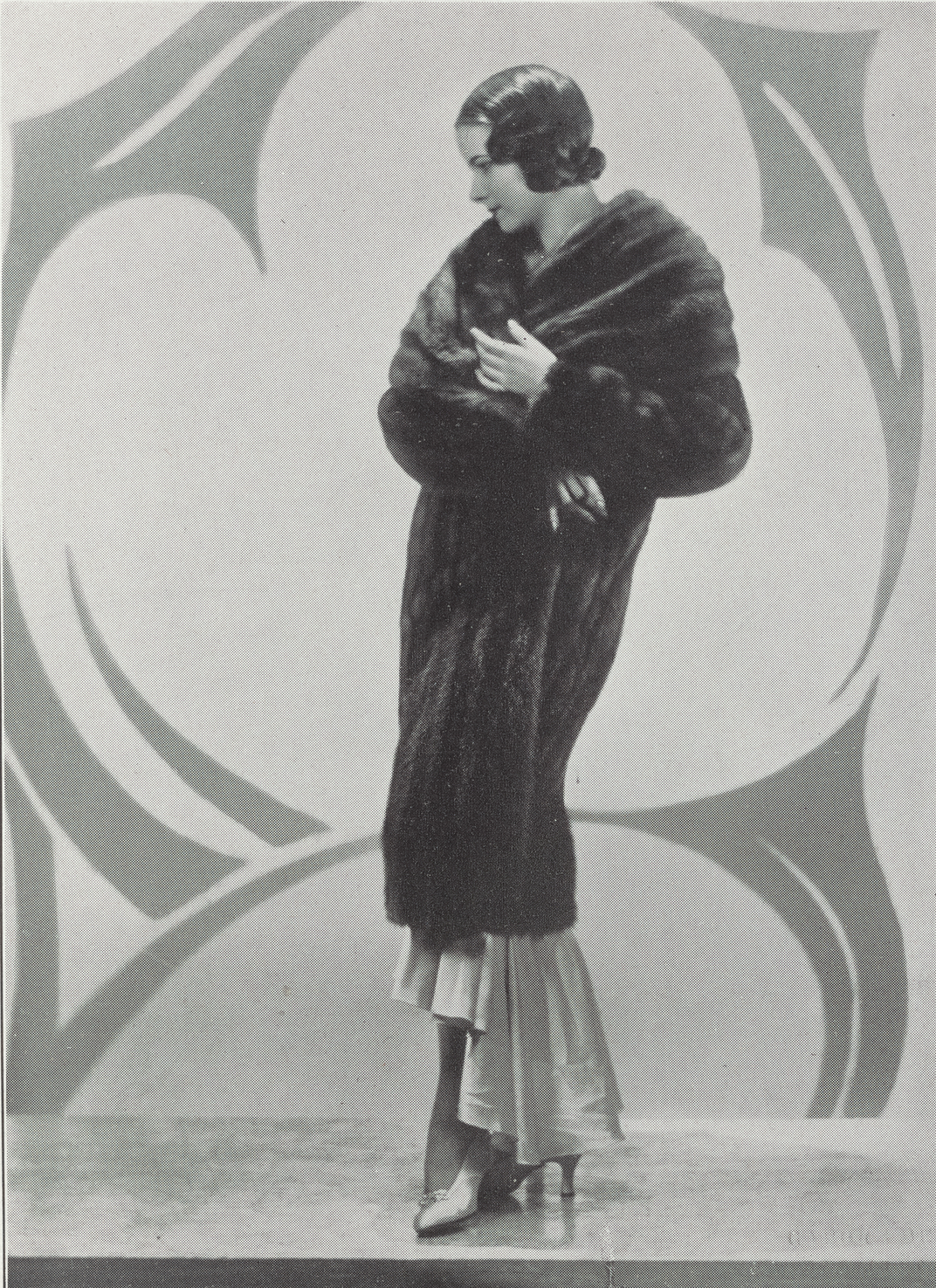
- Born: June 17, 1912; Puerto Rico
- Died: 1947 (aged 34 or 35); New York City, U.S.
- Known for: Ziegfeld Follies
- Spouse(s): Marshall Heminway (m.?-?; divorced); Townshend Martin (m.1941)
- Children: 3

Georgia "Babs" Shanton (June 17, 1912 – 1947) was a Puerto Rican-American performer with the Ziegfeld Follies and a singer with the Lucky Strike Dance Orchestra. She was a model for The John Robert Powers firm, a "Powers Girl" in the early 1930s appearing in many print advertisements.

== Personal life ==
Shanton was born in Puerto Rico to George and Margaret Shanton. She came to the United States at the age of 10, arriving at Ellis Island on November 27, 1922. She attended the Florida State College for Women in Tallahassee, Florida. She was married to Marshall Heminway. They had a son, Marshall, and lived in New York City. She later married Townshend Martin in 1941 and they had two sons Michael and Alan.
