= Zubin Mehta =

Indian conductor (born 1936)

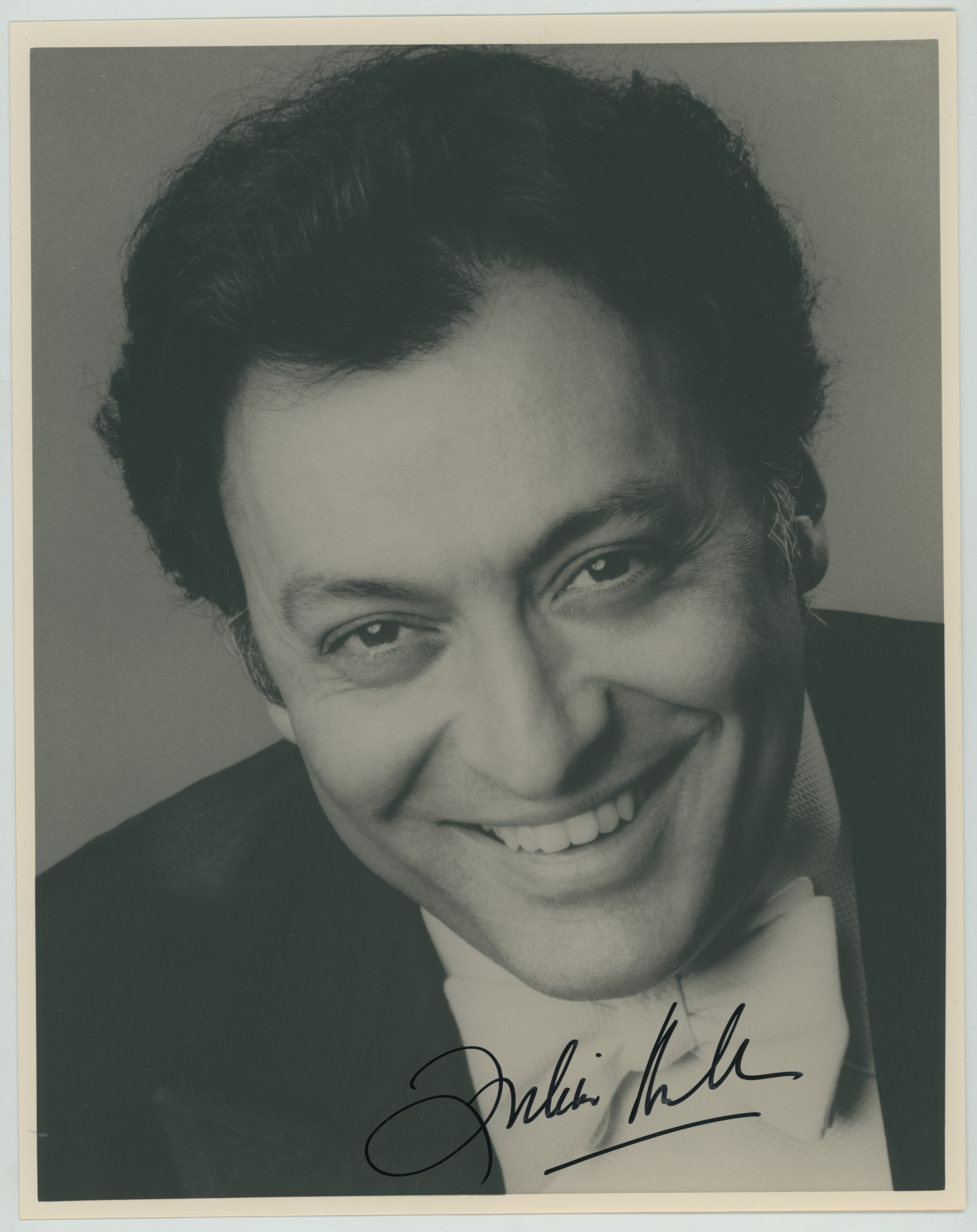
- Mehta in 1985
- Born: 29 April 1936 (age 90); Bombay, Bombay Presidency, British India (now Mumbai, Maharashtra, India)
- Occupation: Conductor
- Years active: 1958–present
- Organizations: Montreal Symphony Orchestra; Los Angeles Philharmonic; New York Philharmonic; Israel Philharmonic Orchestra
- Spouses: Carmen Lasky (m. 1958; div. 1964); Nancy Kovack (m. 1969)
- Children: 4
- Father: Mehli Mehta
- Relatives: Zarin Mehta (brother)
- Website: www.zubinmehta.net

Zubin Mehta (born 29 April 1936) is an Indian conductor of Western classical music. He is music director emeritus of the Israel Philharmonic Orchestra (IPO) and conductor emeritus of the Los Angeles Philharmonic.

Mehta's father was the founder of the Bombay Symphony Orchestra, and Mehta received his early musical education from him. When he was 18, he enrolled in the Vienna state music academy, from which he graduated after three years with a diploma as a conductor. He began winning international competitions and conducted the Royal Liverpool Philharmonic at the age of 21. Beginning in the 1960s, Mehta gained experience by substituting for celebrated maestros throughout the world.

Mehta was music director of the Montreal Symphony Orchestra from 1961 to 1967 and of the Los Angeles Philharmonic from 1962 to 1978, the youngest music director ever for any major North American orchestra (now tied with Gustavo Dudamel, who was hired by the Los Angeles Philharmonic in 2007 at age 26 as well). In 1969, he was appointed music adviser to the Israel Philharmonic Orchestra and in 1981 he became its music director for life. From 1978 to 1991, Mehta was music director of the New York Philharmonic. He was chief conductor of the Maggio Musicale Fiorentino in Florence from 1985 to 2017.

He is an honorary citizen of both Florence and Tel Aviv and was made an honorary member of the Vienna State Opera in 1997 and of the Bavarian State Opera in 2006. The title of honorary conductor was bestowed on him by numerous orchestras throughout the world. More recently, Mehta made several tours with the Bavarian State Opera and kept up a busy schedule of guest conducting appearances. In December 2006, he received the Kennedy Center Honor and in October 2008 he was honored by the Japanese Imperial Family with the Praemium Imperiale. In 2016, Mehta was appointed honorary conductor of the Teatro San Carlo, Naples.

== Early years and education ==
Mehta was born into a Parsi family in Bombay (now Mumbai), India, during the British Raj, the older son of Mehli (1908–2002) and Tehmina (Daruvala) Mehta. His native language is Gujarati. His father was a self-taught violinist who founded and conducted the Bombay Symphony Orchestra and later the American Youth Symphony, which he conducted for 33 years after moving to Los Angeles. His father had previously lived in New York to study with violinist Ivan Galamian, a noted teacher who also taught Itzhak Perlman and Pinchas Zukerman. His father returned to Bombay as an accomplished violinist of the Russian school. Mehta has said that on many occasions when he conducts in the U.S., someone approaches him to say, "You don't know how much I loved your father!"

Mehta has described his childhood as surrounded by music at home all the time, and has said he probably learned to speak Gujarati and sing around the same time. He says his father had a strong influence on him, and he listened to his quartet daily after his father returned from the US after the Second World War. Mehta was first taught to play violin and piano by his father. When he reached his early teens, his father allowed him to lead sectional rehearsals of the Bombay Symphony, and at sixteen, he was conducting the full orchestra during rehearsals.

Mehta graduated from St. Mary's School, Mumbai and went on to study medicine at St. Xavier's College, Mumbai, at the urging of his mother, who wanted him to take up a profession more "respectable" than music. At age eighteen, he dropped out after two years to move to Vienna, one of Europe's music centers, in order to study music under Hans Swarowsky at the state music academy. He lived on $75 per month, and was a contemporary of conductor Claudio Abbado and conductor-pianist Daniel Barenboim.

He remained at the academy for three years, during which time he also studied the double bass, which he played in the Vienna Chamber Orchestra. Swarowsky recognized Mehta's abilities early on, describing him as a "demoniac conductor" who "had it all". While still a student, after the Hungarian Revolution of 1956, he organized a student orchestra in seven days and conducted it in a concert at a refugee camp outside Vienna.

Mehta graduated in 1957 when he was 21 with a diploma in conducting. In 1958, he entered the Liverpool International Conductor's Competition with 100 contestants and took first prize. The prize included a year's contract as associate conductor of the Royal Liverpool Philharmonic, which he conducted in 14 concerts, all of which received rave reviews.

He then was a third-place prizewinner at the summer academy at the Tanglewood Music Center in Massachusetts. At that competition he attracted the notice of Charles Munch, then the conductor of the Boston Symphony, who later helped his career. In 1958, he boldly programmed an all-Schoenberg concert, which did so well that he accepted further bookings. That same year he also married a Canadian voice student, Carmen Lasky, whom he met in Vienna.

== Conducting career ==
=== 1960s ===
During 1960 and 1961, Mehta was asked to substitute for celebrated maestros throughout the world, receiving high critical acclaim for most of those concerts. In 1960, he conducted a series for the Vienna Symphony and later that summer made his New York conducting debut leading the New York Philharmonic.

[Mehta] has the capacity to control every sound made by an orchestra, and he does this with the simplest of gestures, every one of which has an immediate and perceptible effect. He has a talent for conveying a mood of serenity, or of serene grandeur, to both orchestra and audiences that is rare indeed among the younger generation of conductors.

— Music critic Winthrop Sargeant,
on Mehta's 1967 New York debut at Carnegie Hall

In 1960, with the help of Charles Munch, Mehta became the chief conductor and music director of the Montreal Symphony Orchestra, a post he held until 1967. By 1961, he had already conducted the Vienna, Berlin and Israel Philharmonic orchestras. In 1962, he took the Montreal Symphony and Canadian soloists (pianist Ronald Turini and soprano Teresa Stratas) on a concert tour to Moscow, Leningrad, Paris and Vienna. Mehta was most apprehensive about his concert in Vienna, which he said was considered the "capital of Western music". His single concert there received a 20-minute ovation, 14 curtain calls, and two encores.

In 1961, he was named assistant conductor of the Los Angeles Philharmonic (LAP), although the orchestra's music director designate, Georg Solti, was not consulted on the appointment, and resigned in protest. The orchestra had been without a permanent conductor for four years when Mehta started directing it.

Mehta was named music director of the orchestra and held the post from 1962 to 1978. When he began his first season with the orchestra in 1962, he was 26, the youngest person ever to hold that title. As he had also conducted the Montreal Symphony during those early years, he became the first person to direct two North American symphony orchestras at the same time.

As the LAP's first conductor in four years, Mehta worked to polish its overall sound to something closer to the Vienna Philharmonic's. He succeeded in making its sound warmer and richer by fostering competition among the musicians, shifting assignments, giving promotions and changing seating arrangements. He also inspired the musicians; 21-year-old cellist Jacqueline du Pré said, "He provides a magic carpet for you to float on." Cellist Kurt Reher recalls Mehta's first rehearsal with the orchestra: "within two beats we were entranced. It seemed this young man had the ability, the musical knowledge of a man of 50 or 55."

In 1965, after Mehta's debut with the Metropolitan Opera's performance of Aida, music critic Alan Rich wrote, "Mehta brought to the conducting of the score a kind of bedazzlement that has no peer in recent times ... It was a lunging, teeming, breathless performance that still had plenty of breath." He subsequently conducted the Met in performances of Carmen, Tosca, and Turandot.

For Montreal's Expo 67, he conducted both the Montreal and the Los Angeles orchestras together for a performance of Berlioz's Symphonie fantastique. Also that year, Mehta conducted the world premier of Marvin David Levy's Mourning Becomes Electra.

By May 1967, his schedule was becoming overcrowded and he resigned his Montreal post. That fall he took the 107-member Los Angeles Philharmonic on an eight-week tour, including engagements in Vienna, Paris, Athens, and Bombay. By 1968, his popularity kept him busier than the year before, including 22 weeks of concerts with the Los Angeles Philharmonic, three operas at the Met, television appearances in the U.S. and Italy, five recording sessions, and guest appearances at five festivals and with five orchestras. Time magazine put him on its cover in January 1968. In 1969 his schedule remained equally active.

In 1970, Mehta performed with Frank Zappa's Mothers of Invention on Zappa's "200 Motels" and Edgar Varese's Intergrales, at UCLA's Pauley Pavilion basketball stadium with an audience of 12,000. There is no authorized recording, though some bootlegs exist.

=== 1970s–1980s ===
In 1978, Mehta became the music director and principal conductor of the New York Philharmonic and remained there until his resignation in 1991.

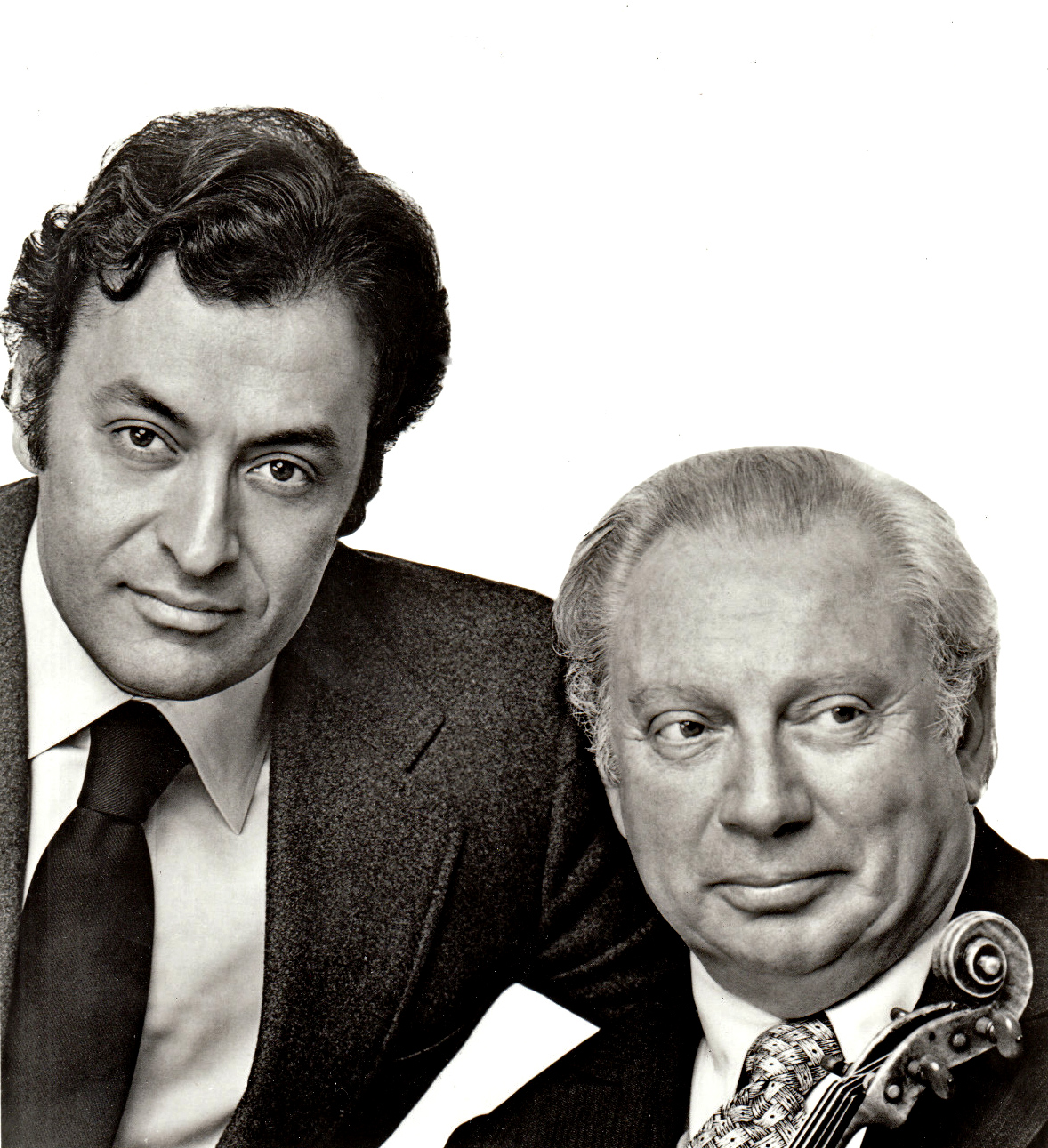
Mehta with Isaac Stern at Lincoln Center, 1980

He became music director of the Israel Philharmonic Orchestra (IPO) in 1977. He began the first of many guest appearances with the IPO in 1961. In 1966, he toured with the orchestra, and during the 1967 Arab–Israeli war, he rushed back to Israel to conduct several special concerts to demonstrate solidarity with its people. He was appointed IPO's music advisor in 1969, music director in 1977, and was made its music director for life in 1981.

During his five-decade connection with the IPO, he has conducted it in thousands of concerts in Israel and abroad. He conducted concerts with the IPO in South Lebanon in 1982, after which Arabs rushed onstage to hug the musicians. He conducted it during the Gulf War in 1991, when the audience brought gas masks; in 2007, it played for an entirely Arab audience in Nazareth. He claims to have a deep kinship with Israel's musicians and the spirit and tradition of the Jewish people. He adds that conducting the IPO is "something I do for my heart". Recalling those earlier years, he says: "How I would love to see that sight again today, of Arabs and Jews hugging each other. I'm a positive thinker. I know this day will come."

In 1978, Mehta left the Los Angeles Philharmonic to become music director for the New York Philharmonic (NYP). Among the reasons he wanted to direct the NYP was that it allowed him to experiment with new ideas, such as taking the orchestra to Harlem. There, they played at the Abyssinian Baptist Church each year. Accompanying the orchestra with Mehta for various concerts were Isaac Stern, Itzhak Perlman, and Kathleen Battle. He stayed with the NYP until 1991.

External audio
- You may hear Zubin Mehta with the Israel Philharmonic in Antonin Dvorak's Symphony No. 7 in D minor, Op. 70 in 1968; Here on Archive.org

From 1985 to 2017, Mehta was chief conductor of the Teatro del Maggio Musicale Fiorentino in Florence. From 1998 until 2006, he was music director of the Bavarian State Opera in Munich. The Munich Philharmonic named him its honorary conductor. Since 2005, Mehta has been the main conductor of the Palau de les Arts, the new opera house of the Ciutat de les Arts i les Ciències in Valencia, Spain.

While he was the conductor of the New York Philharmonic, Mehta commissioned Ravi Shankar's Concerto No. 2 for sitar and orchestra. Following New York performances, the concerto was later recorded with the London Philharmonic Orchestra.

=== 1990s ===
In 1998, he went to Munich where he began directing the Bavarian State Opera, because, he said, it provided "another panorama for me, to be involved in the running of an opera house".

In 1990, he conducted the Orchestra del Maggio Musicale Fiorentino and the Orchestra del Teatro dell'Opera di Roma in the first ever Three Tenors concert in Rome, joining the tenors again in 1994 at the Dodger Stadium, Los Angeles. In between those appearances, he conducted the historic 1992 production of Tosca in which each act took place in the actual setting and at the actual time specified in the score. This production starred Catherine Malfitano in the title role, Plácido Domingo as Cavaradossi and Ruggero Raimondi as Baron Scarpia. Act I was telecast live from Rome's Basilica of Sant'Andrea della Valle on Saturday, 11 July, at noon (Central European Daylight Saving Time); act II was telecast later that evening from the Palazzo Farnese at 9:40 p.m.; act III was telecast live on Sunday, 12 July, at 7:00 am from the Castel Sant'Angelo, also known as Hadrian's Tomb.

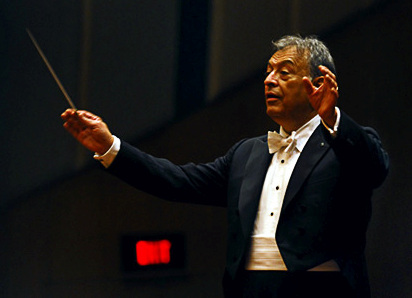
Mehta conducting the Israel Philharmonic Orchestra in Mumbai, October 2008

In June 1994, Mehta performed the Mozart Requiem with the members of the Sarajevo Symphony Orchestra and Chorus at the ruins of Sarajevo's National Library, in a fundraising concert for the victims of armed conflict and remembrance of the thousands of people killed in the Yugoslav Wars. On 29 August 1999, he conducted Mahler's Symphony No. 2 (Resurrection), at the vicinity of Buchenwald concentration camp in Weimar, with the Bavarian State Orchestra and the Israel Philharmonic Orchestra sitting alongside each other.

He toured India (Mumbai) in 1984 with the New York Philharmonic, and again in November–December 1994 with the Israel Philharmonic Orchestra, along with soloists Itzhak Perlman and Gil Shaham. In 1997 and 1998, Mehta worked in collaboration with Chinese film director Zhang Yimou on a production of Giacomo Puccini's opera Turandot, which they took to Florence and to Beijing, where it was staged in its actual surroundings in the Forbidden City, with over 300 extras and 300 soldiers, for nine historic performances. The making of this production was chronicled in the documentary The Turandot Project, which Mehta narrated.

Mehta was a guest conductor for the American Russian Young Artists Orchestra.

=== 2000s ===
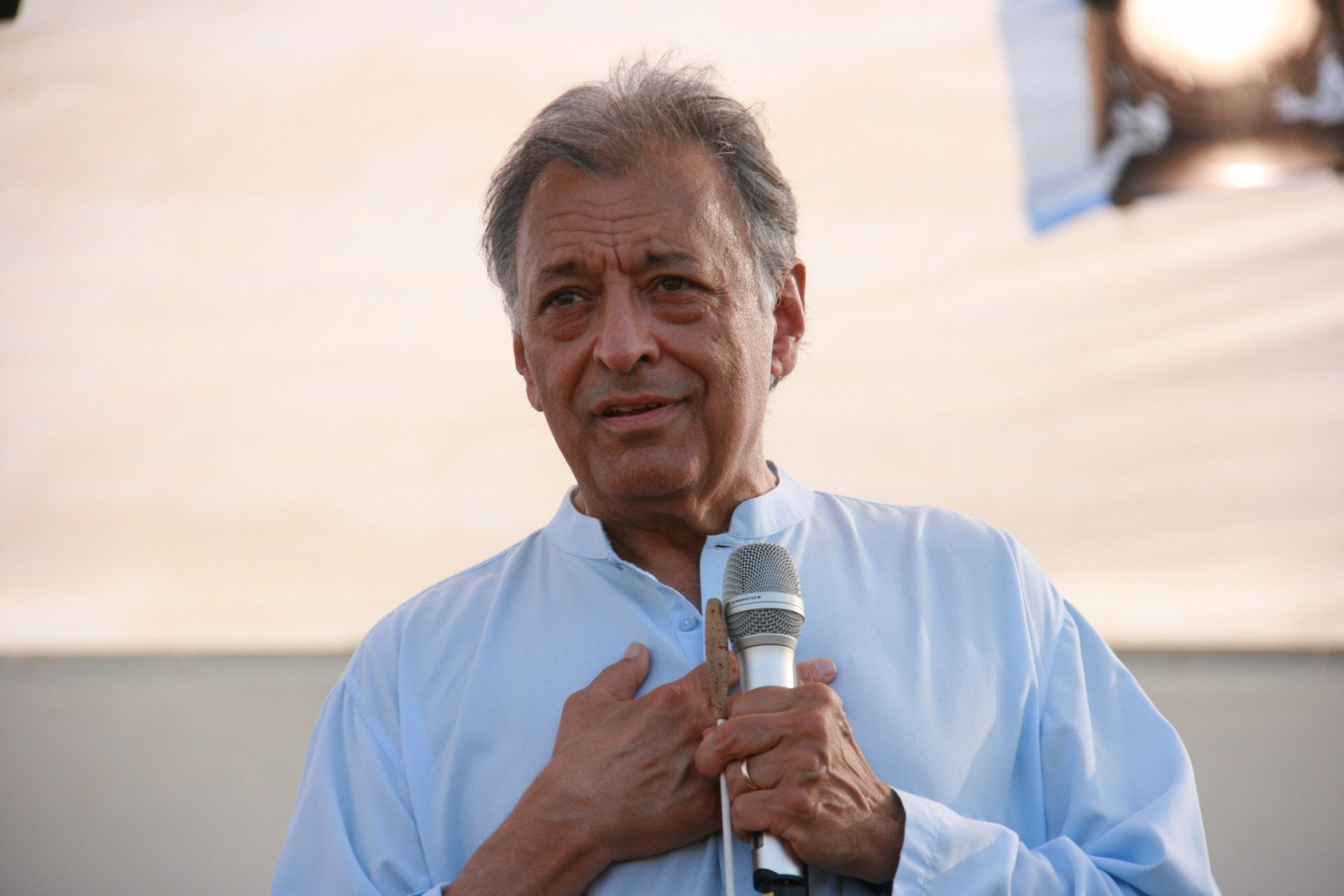
Mehta in 2010

On 26 December 2005, the first anniversary of the Indian Ocean tsunami, Mehta and the Bavarian State Orchestra performed for the first time in Chennai (formerly Madras) at the Madras Music Academy. This tsunami memorial concert was organized by the German consulate in Chennai along with the Max-Mueller Bhavan/Goethe-Institut. 2006 was his last year with the Bavarian State Orchestra.

=== 2010s ===
In 2011, Mehta's performance with the Israel Philharmonic Orchestra at The Proms in London was picketed and interrupted by pro-Palestinian protesters, which caused the BBC to halt the live radio relay of the concert, the first such incident in Proms history. In September 2013, Mehta appeared with the Bavarian State Orchestra at a special concert, Ehsaas e Kashmir, organized by the German Embassy in India, at Mughal Gardens, Srinagar. Mehta and the orchestra renounced their usual fees for this concert.

In October 2015, he returned to Chennai to perform with the Australian World Orchestra (AWO) at the Madras Music Academy.

In 2016, the Harbin Symphony Orchestra and the Israel Philharmonic Orchestra performed two concerts conducted by Mehta in the frame of 33rd Harbin Summer Music Festival at Harbin Concert Hall.

In December 2016, the Israel Philharmonic announced that Mehta would conclude his tenure as music director in October 2019. He now has the title of music director emeritus of the Israel Philharmonic.

In August 2022, Mehta conducted the Australian World Orchestra (AWO) in Sydney and Melbourne at Concert Hall, Sydney Opera House and Hamer Hall, Arts Centre Melbourne. He also conducted the AWO at the Edinburgh International Festival and the BBC Proms 2022.

== Personal life ==
His first marriage was to Canadian soprano Carmen Lasky in 1958. They have a son, an executive director of performing arts for The Royal Conservatory of Music in Toronto, and a daughter. In 1964 they divorced. Two years after the divorce, Lasky married Mehta's brother, Zarin Mehta, formerly the executive director of the New York Philharmonic.

His second daughter was born in Los Angeles in 1967, the offspring of a relationship between his marriages.

In July 1969, Mehta married Nancy Kovack, an American former film and television actress. His second son was born in the 1990s as the result of an extra-marital affair in Israel during this second marriage.

A permanent resident of the United States, Mehta retains his Indian citizenship.

One of his close friends was Ravi Shankar, whom he first met in the 1960s when Mehta directed him with the Montreal Symphony. Their friendship continued after they were both living in Los Angeles and later in New York. "This was a wonderful period in my life and Zubin and I really had a great time."

=== Political views ===
Mehta was a member of the executive committee of the Writers and Artists for Peace in the Middle East, a pro-Israel group. However in January 2026, Mehta announced the cancelation of every show in Israel in protest of Benjamin Netanyahu's handling of the Gaza War.

== Honours and awards ==
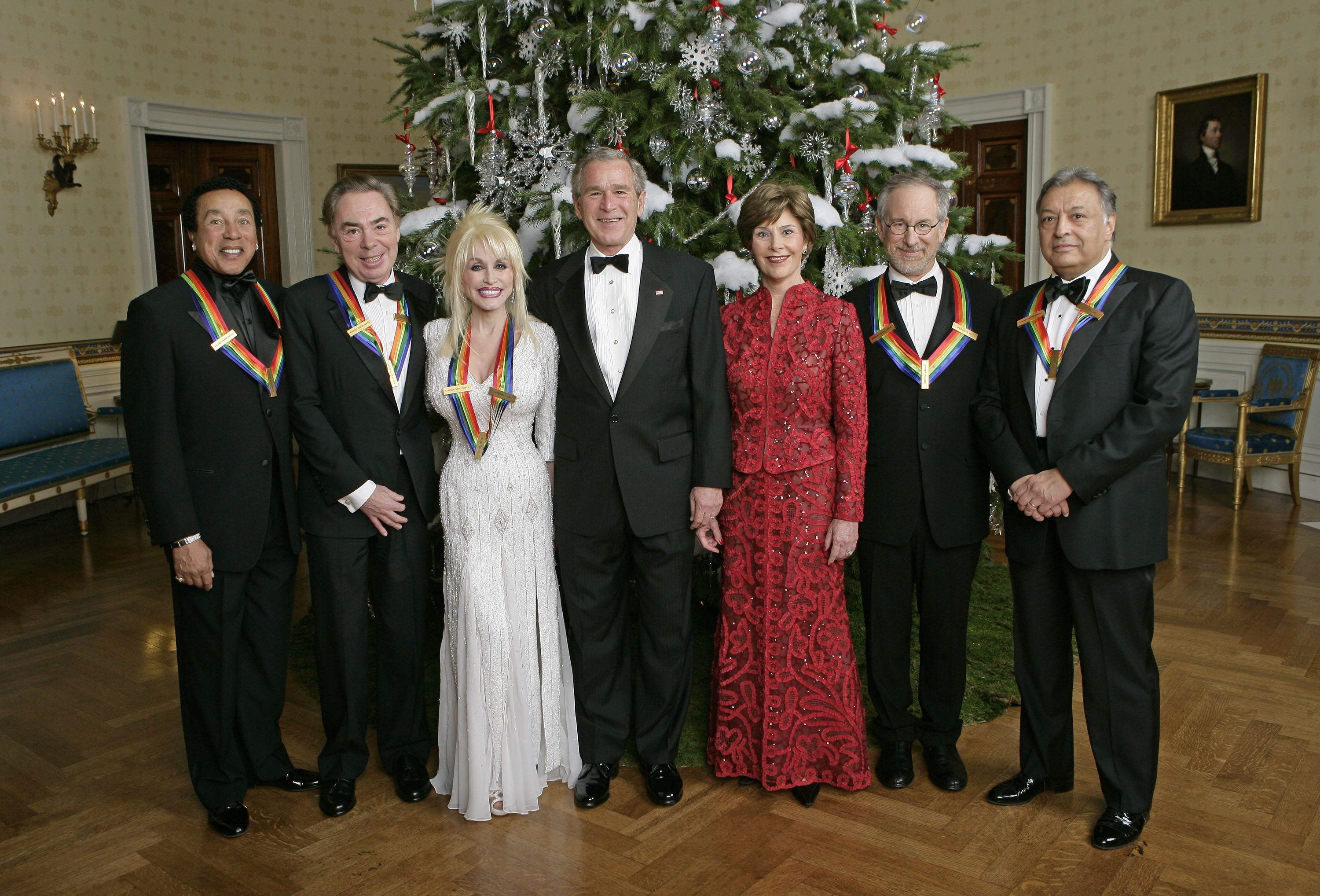
U.S. president George W. Bush and First Lady Laura Bush stand with the Kennedy Center honourees in the Blue Room of the White House during a reception Sunday, 3 December 2006. From left, they are singer and songwriter Smokey Robinson; Andrew Lloyd Webber; country singer Dolly Parton; film director Steven Spielberg; and Zubin Mehta.

=== State honours ===
- The Government of India honoured Mehta in 1966 with India's third-highest civilian award, the Padma Bhushan and in 2001 with second-highest civilian award, the Padma Vibhushan.
- In 2022 he was awarded President's Medal by the Israeli president Shimon Peres.
- In September 2019, President of Slovenia Borut Pahor conferred the Golden Order of Merit on Zubin Mehta for his contribution to music and the inspiring effort to connect people and nations with this form of art.
- In September 2022, was appointed an Honorary Companion of the Order of Australia by the governor-general of Australia David Hurley in recognition of his eminent service to the Australia-India bilateral relationship and humanity-at-large, particularly in the fields of classical music and philanthropy.

=== Other Recognitions ===
- In 1965, he received an honorary doctorate from Sir George Williams University, which later became Concordia University.
- Mehta's name is mentioned in the song Billy the Mountain on the 1972 album Just Another Band from L.A. by Frank Zappa and The Mothers of Invention. Cellist Kurt Reher, who played when Mehta conducted the Los Angeles Philharmonic, was also a guest musician with The Mothers of Invention.
- At the Israel Prize ceremony in 1991, Mehta was awarded a special prize in recognition of his unique devotion to Israel and to the Israel Philharmonic Orchestra.
- In 1995, he became a Laureate of the Wolf Prize in Arts.
- In 1999, Mehta was presented the "Lifetime Achievement Peace and Tolerance Award" of the United Nations.
- In September 2006, the Kennedy Center announced Mehta as one of the recipients of that year's Kennedy Center Honors, presented on 3 December 2006.
- In February 2007, Mehta was the recipient of the Second Annual Bridgebuilder Award at Loyola Marymount University.
- Mehta is an honorary citizen of Florence and Tel Aviv. He was made an honorary member of the Vienna State Opera in 1997. In 2001 he was bestowed the title of "Honorary Conductor" of the Vienna Philharmonic and in 2004 the Munich Philharmonic awarded him the same title, as did the Los Angeles Philharmonic and the Teatro del Maggio Musicale Fiorentino in 2006. At the end of his tenure with the Bavarian State Opera, he was named honorary conductor of the Bavarian State Orchestra and honorary member of the Bavarian State Opera, and the Gesellschaft der Musikfreunde, Wien, appointed him an honorary member in November 2007.
- Also in 2007 Mehta received the prestigious Dan David Prize. Conductor Karl Böhm awarded Mehta the Nikisch Ring – the Vienna Philharmonic Ring of Honor.
- In October 2008, Mehta received the Praemium Imperiale (World Culture Prize in Memory of His Imperial Highness Prince Takamatsu), Japan.
- In March 2011, Mehta received the 2,434th star on the Hollywood Walk of Fame. In October 2011 he received the Echo Klassik in Berlin, for his life's work.
- In September 2013, President of India Pranab Mukherjee awarded him the Tagore Award 2013 for his outstanding contribution towards cultural harmony.
- In January 2019, the Los Angeles Philharmonic named Mehta as their conductor emeritus.
- In February 2019, the Berlin Philharmonic made Mehta an honorary member as an expression of gratitude for their long association.
- In November 2020, the World Jewish Congress presented Mehta with their fifth Teddy Kollek Award for the Advancement of Jewish Culture.

== Films ==
Mehta's life was documented in Terry Sanders's film Portrait of Zubin Mehta (1968). Another documentary about Mehta titled, Zubin and I, was produced by the grandson of an Israeli harpist who played with the Israel Philharmonic Orchestra before Mehta assumed the helm. The filmmaker joins the orchestra on a tour of Mumbai and meets with him for two interviews, in India and Tel Aviv.

In Christopher Nupen's 1969 documentary The Trout about a performance of Schubert's Trout Quintet in London by Jacqueline du Pré, Daniel Barenboim, Pinchas Zukerman, Itzhak Perlman, and Mehta; he plays the double bass.

Mehta and the Los Angeles Philharmonic are featured in Allan Miller's 1973 film The Bolero.

Mehta was also mentioned in the novel Master of the Game (1982) by Sidney Sheldon.

Mehta has played himself as the pivotal figure in On Wings of Fire, a 1986 film about the history of Zoroastrianism and prophet Zarathushtra.

Zubin Mehta: In Rehearsal (1996) depicts Mehta rehearsing Till Eulenspiegel's Merry Pranks with the Israel Philharmonic.

Mehta and his orchestra stars in the 2017 Spanish film documentary Dancing Beethoven, which tells the preparation of the Ninth Symphony. The film was nominated in the 32nd Goya Awards for Best Documentary Film and in the XXIII Premio Cinematográfico José María Forqué.

A 2008 release by Unitel Classica/Medici Arts presents Mehta and the Los Angeles Philharmonic in performances of the Bassoon Concerto by Mozart, the Concerto for Orchestra by Bartók, and three pieces of Dvořák, including his 8th Symphony. These were filmed in January 1977.

== Educational projects ==
In 2009, Mehta established Mifneh (Hebrew for "change"), a music education program for Israeli Arabs, in cooperation with Bank Leumi and the Arab Israel Bank. Three schools, in Shfaram, the Jezreel Valley, and Nazareth, are taking part in the pilot project.

He and his brother Zarin constitute the Advisor Council of the Mehli Mehta Foundation.

In 2005, Mehta and philanthropist Josef Buchmann founded the Buchmann-Mehta School of Music as a partnership between Tel Aviv University and the Israel Philharmonic Orchestra. Mehta is the school's honorary president and has remained actively involved since its inception.

Cultural offices
Preceded by Jean Martinon (Music Advisor)	Music Director, Israel Philharmonic Orchestra; 1977–2019	Succeeded by Lahav Shani
Preceded by Riccardo Muti	Chief Conductor, Maggio Musicale Fiorentino; 1985–2017	Succeeded by Fabio Luisi
