= Babs Reingold =

American sculptor

Babs Reingold (born in Caracas, Venezuela) is an American contemporary interdisciplinary artist working with sculpture, installation, video, painting and drawing. She currently lives and works in St. Petersburg, Florida and maintains a studio in New York City.

== Art ==
Reingold is best known as a visual and conceptual artist for creating alternate ambiguities with her wall art and installations as they relate to the environment, poverty and beauty. She draws on her early experiences of hardship to create elaborate installations using domestic objects and natural materials like clotheslines, threads, human hair, animal skins, organza fabric structures, rust and tea staining, and encaustic. The dynamics of the environment, power, technology, and the manipulation and destruction of nature are recurring themes in her art. Her installation The Last Tree portrays the world's 193 countries with fabricated silk organza tree stumps stuffed with human hair in pails. This elaborate installation, curated by Midori Yoshimoto at the ISE Cultural Foundation in New York, illuminates Jared Diamond's question What was the Easter Islander thinking when he chopped down the last tree? resulting in a culture that demolished the entire wealth of its natural resources. A second show of the traveling exhibit was at the Burchfield Penney Art Center in Buffalo, New York in 2016-2017. Recent museum showings were at the Museum of Fine Arts (St. Petersburg, Florida) in 2015-2016.

== Personal life ==
After spending her childhood in Caracas, and youth in Dallas, Texas, Reingold endured grinding poverty as an adolescent in Woodhill, a public housing complex in Cleveland, Ohio with her mother and four siblings after her photographer father became ill with multiple sclerosis and her mother was unable to cope,. Reingold later escaped the cycle of poverty to become a successful artist. She graduated with a Bachelor of Fine Arts (BFA) degree from the Cleveland Institute of Art, and obtained a Master of Fine Arts (MFA) degree from the University at Buffalo, The State University of New York.

== Museum collections ==
Reingold's works of art can be found in numerous public and private collections around the world, and are included in the permanent collections of the Newark Museum of Art in Newark, New Jersey; the Museum of Fine Arts (St. Petersburg, Florida) in St. Petersburg, Florida; and the Savannah College of Art and Design in Savannah, Georgia, among others.
