= Festival del Sole =

Music, arts and wine festival

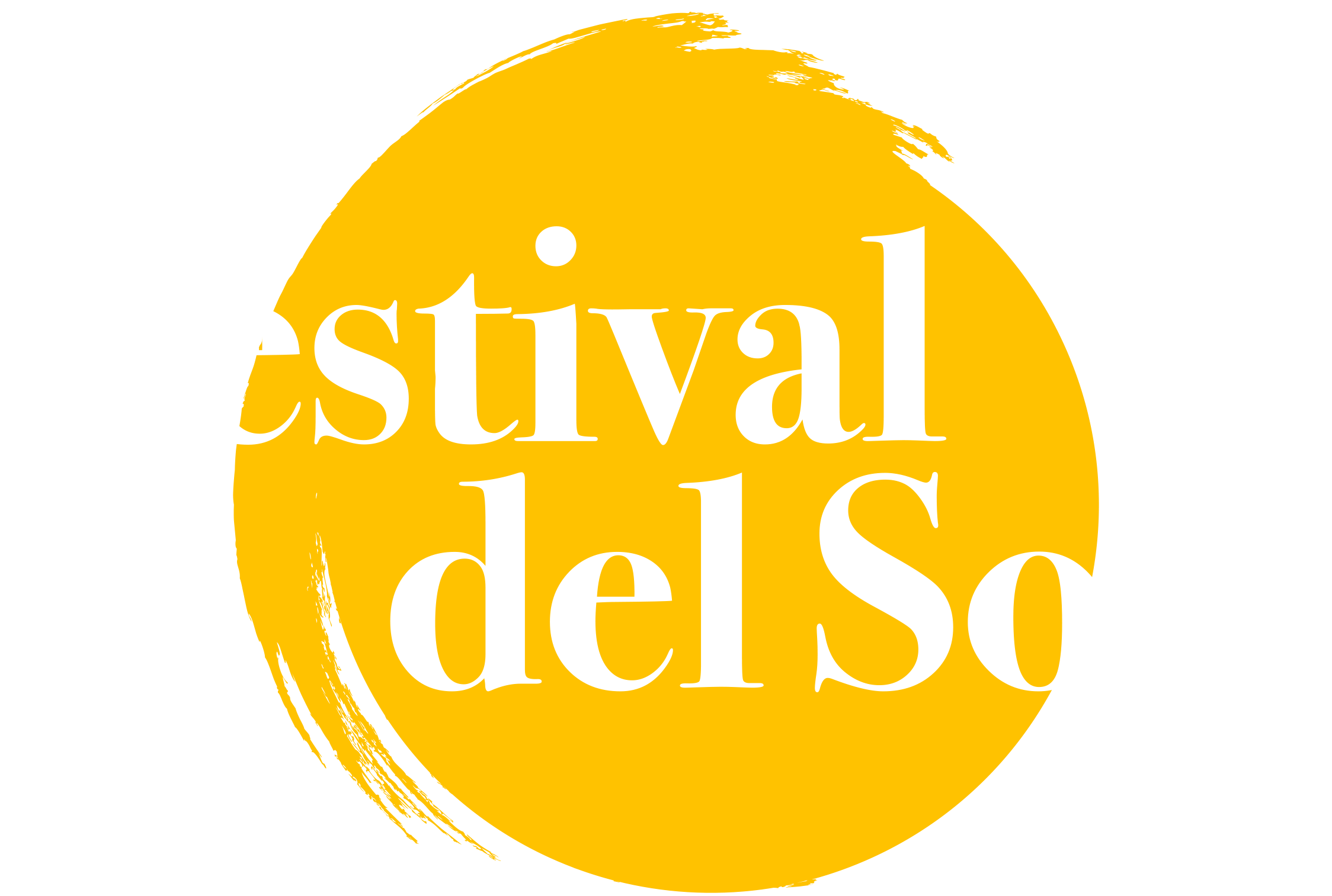
- Genre: Festival
- Venue: Teatro della Pergola, Tuscany; Napa Valley, California; Green Music Center, Sonoma Valley, California
- Inaugurated: 2003
- Founder: Barrett Wissman
- Website: festivaldelsolearts.com

Festival del Sole was initially an Italian music festival, established in 2003. The concept had its origins in the 1990s, when arts entrepreneur and pianist Barrett Wissman and wife, cellist Nina Kotova, discussed organizing an event somewhere in the world where friends could make music together in a warm, welcoming atmosphere.

== History ==
In 2003, the first Festival del Sole was held in Cortona, Tuscany, and incorporated a vast array of events including concerts, fine art exhibitions, culinary events, wine tastings, and literary events. In 2006, Wissman brought the Festival Del Sole to Napa Valley, which has now become Festival Napa Valley.

== Performers ==
Over the years, the festival has attracted a lineup of some of the world’s greatest musicians, artists, actors, chefs and personalities including Robert Redford, Placido Domingo, Renée Fleming, Sting (musician), Thomas Keller, Antonio Pappano, Sophia Loren, Pinchas Zukerman, John Malkovich, Midori Gotō, Teodor Currentzis, Maxim Vengerov, Lang Lang, Bobby McFerrin, Anthony Hopkins, Joshua Bell, Sarah Chang, Jeremy Irons, Jean Yves Thibaudet, Cecilia Bartoli, Hélène Grimaud, Tony Bennett, Angela Gheorghiu, Vittorio Grigolo, Martha Argerich, David Foster, Whoopi Goldberg, Michael Keaton, Al Jarreau, Elvis Costello, Frances Mayes, Anna Netrebko, Sir James Galway, Vladimir Jurowski, Stéphane Denève, Nikolaj Znaider, Mikhail Baryshnikov, Dmitri Sitkovetsky, Salvatore Accardo, Jonas Kaufmann, Nigel Kennedy, Jaap Van Zweden, and many more.

== Description ==
In 2024, Wissman has decided to bring back the artistic level and tradition of the Festival del Sole to the wine country of Northern California in partnership with the Green Music Center at Sonoma State University and its Executive Director Jacob Yarrow.
