= Zarin Mehta =

Indian-Canadian arts executive (born 1938)

Zarin Mehta C.M.
- Born: 28 October 1938 (age 87); Bombay, India
- Citizenship: Canada, India
- Spouse: Carmen Lasky (m. 1966)
- Children: 2
- Parent(s): Mehli Mehta; Tehmina Daruvala
- Relatives: Zubin Mehta (brother); Bejun Mehta (distant relative)
- Awards: Bravo award, Dominican Republic, 1996; Arts Entrepreneurship award, Columbia College, 1997; Dushkin award, Music Institute of Chicago, 1998.

Zarin Mehta (born 28 October 1938) is an Indian-Canadian arts executive who served as the president and executive director of the New York Philharmonic Orchestra from 2000 to 2012, in addition to various positions in the performing arts industry.

== Career ==
Mehta is a chartered accountant. During his career at the public accounting firm Coopers & Lybrand (1962-1981) in Montreal, he rose to partner. He was an accountant at Frederic B. Smart & Co., in London (1957-1962).

=== Montreal Symphony Orchestra ===
Mehta was managing director of the Montreal Symphony Orchestra from 1981 to 1990.

=== Ravinia Festival ===
Mehta was named executive director of the Ravinia Festival in 1990 and later became president and CEO. During his 10-year tenure he pioneered the jazz festival within Ravinia and a world music series.

=== New York Philharmonic ===
Mehta was appointed New York Philharmonic executive director in September 2000 and received the additional role of president in June 2004. He was instrumental in securing the logistics for the 2008 New York Philharmonic visit to North Korea.

On 27 September 2010 Mehta announced he would step down as president and chief executive of the New York Philharmonic when his contract expires after the 2011-2012 season, after having spent 12 years at the Philharmonic.

=== Sonoma State University ===
Mehta was named co-executive director of the Green Music Center at Sonoma State University in October 2013. Both artist Lang Lang and benefactor Sandy Weill were instrumental in his appointment. President of the university, Judy K. Sakaki, announced in December 2016 that as part of a plan to restructure Green Music Center management, a single executive director will be hired to fulfill the duties of both Mehta and the interim co-executive director, Stan Nosek.

Mehta's total pay and benefits during 2015 was $625,339.56. In 2015, Mehta was identified as the highest earning employee of the California State University system. Mehta retired from Sonoma State in 2017.

== Personal ==
He is the brother of Zubin Mehta and son of the late Mehli Mehta, founder of the Bombay Symphony Orchestra. He is married to Canadian soprano Carmen Lasky, who was previously married to his brother Zubin. He is of Parsi descent.
