= University of Florida College of Journalism and Communications =

Academic college of the University of Florida

College of Journalism and Communications
- Type: Public
- Established: 1925; 101 years ago
- Parent institution: University of Florida
- Dean: Hub Brown
- Undergraduates: 2,300
- Postgraduates: 600
- Location: Gainesville, Florida, United States; 29°38′52.3″N 82°20′51.0″W
- Website: www.jou.ufl.edu

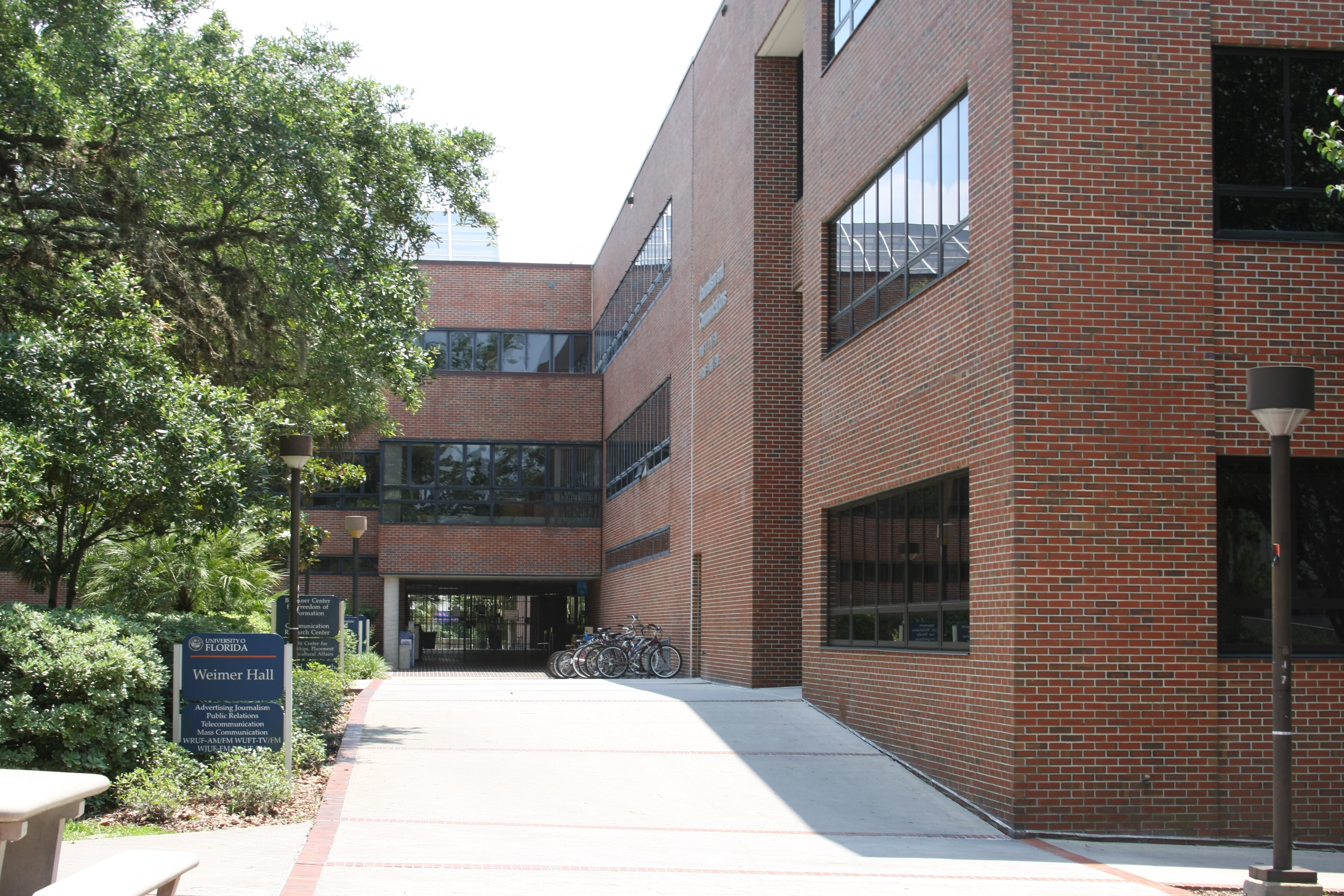
Weimer Hall, home of the College of Journalism and Communications

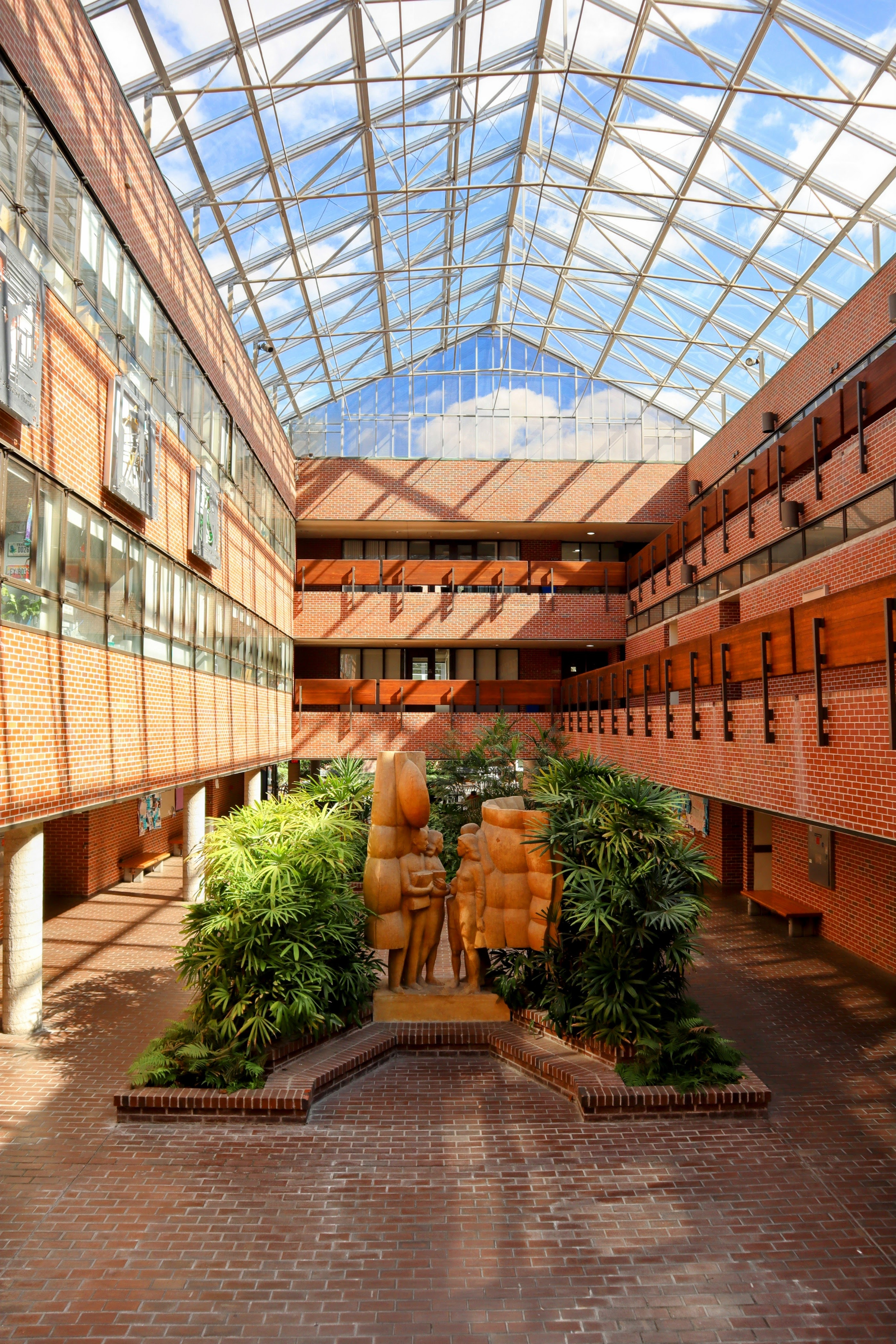
Interior view of Weimer Hall, home of the College of Journalism and Communications

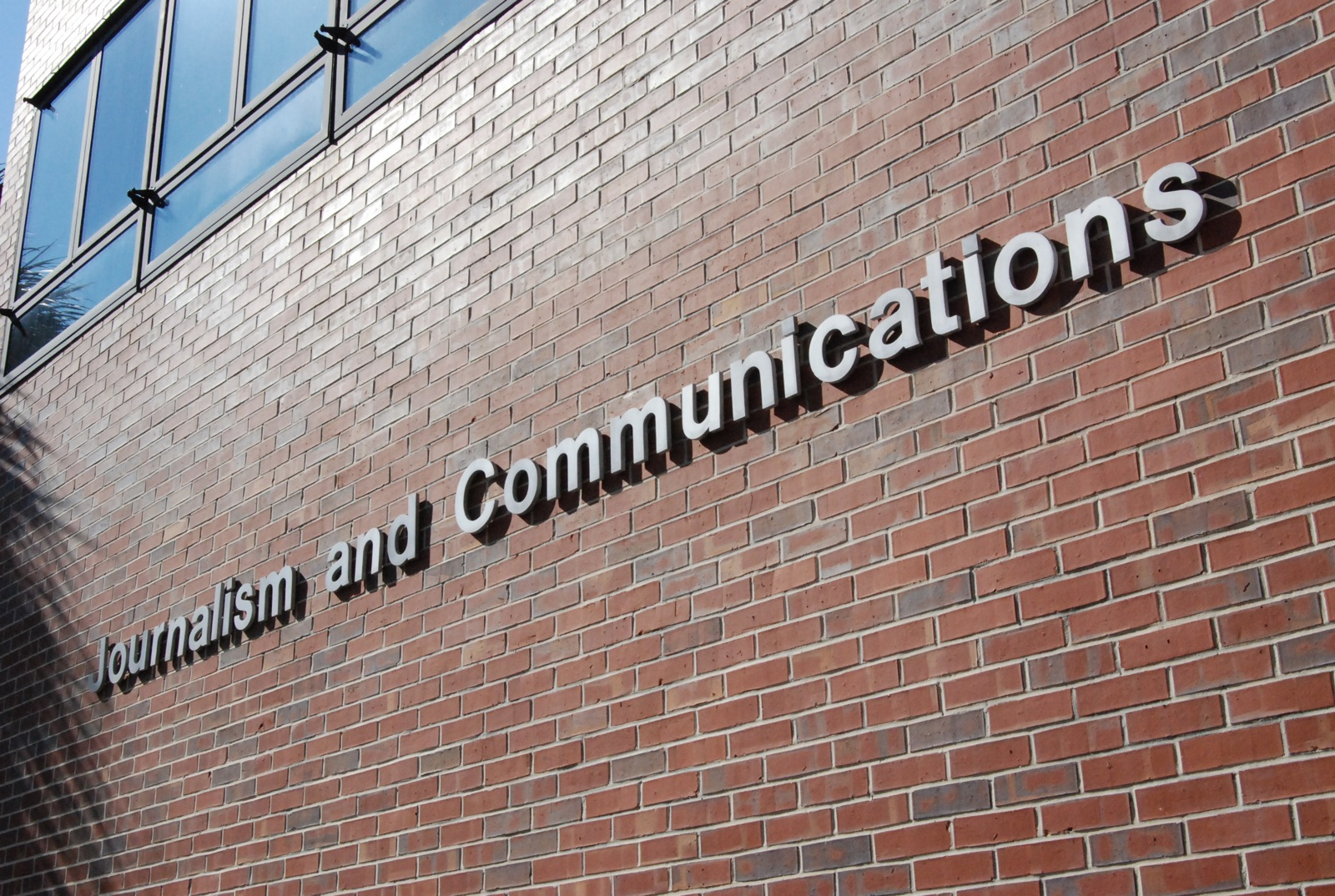
Weimer Hall

The College of Journalism and Communications (CJC) is the journalism school of the University of Florida.

== History ==
The college traces its origins to 1925 when the Department of Journalism was formed in Language Hall (now Anderson Hall). Orland K. "O.K." Armstrong was the first head of the department. The first three journalism degrees were awarded in 1928.

The department moved into Buckman Hall, a renovated dormitory, in 1937.

Rae O. Weimer, the former managing editor at the New York City daily newspaper PM, began teaching in the Department of Journalism in 1949. In 1950, the journalism program was accredited, although it still had only "one classroom, no equipment and only two teachers." In late 1953, broadcasting was transferred to journalism, and the department became the School of Journalism and Communications.

In 1967, the school became a full-fledged college. Weimer was named the first dean; the current journalism building, Weimer Hall, is named for him.

From 1976 to 1994, Ralph Lowenstein served as dean and carried out the digital transformation of the college.

On July 1, 2021, Hub Brown assumed the role of Dean. Hub Brown was an associate dean and professor at the S. I. Newhouse School of Public Communications at Syracuse University. He succeeds Diane McFarlin, who retired after serving eight years in that role.

== Research ==
The CJC was awarded $7 million in annual research expenditures in sponsored research for 2024.

== Academics ==
The department comprises four departments:

- Department of Journalism (journalism)
- Department of Media Production, Management, & Technology (MPMT)
- Department of Advertising (advertising)
- Department of Public Relations (public relations)

== Famous Alumni ==
- Stephanie Abrams, reporter for The Weather Channel
- Erin Andrews, reporter for Fox Sports and formerly ESPN
- Edward Aschoff, reporter for ESPN
- Sharyl Attkisson, former correspondent for CBS News
- Jackie Bange, current anchor with WGN-TV
- Kristen Berset, current anchor for WBFF
- Ernie Bjorkman, former anchor for KWGN-TV in Denver, and winner of two Emmy Awards
- Pam Bondi, correspondent for Fox News
- Jenn Brown, two-time Emmy Award-winning sports reporter for ESPN
- Kavita Channe, television and radio personality, known for appearing on Paradise Hotel
- Linda Church, morning weather anchor for WPIX in New York
- Bob Collins, former broadcaster for WGN-TV in Chicago
- Mark Curtis, current anchor for WLNE-TV
- H. G. Davis Jr., Pulitzer Prize-winning reporter
- Jamie Dupree, correspondent for Cox Broadcasting Washington News Bureau
- David Finkel, journalist and Pulitzer Prize-winning reporter for The Washington Post
- Kristin Harmel, novelist and reporter for People magazine
- Dan Hicken, sports director and anchor for WTLV/WJXX in Jacksonville, Florida
- Susan Hutchison, former anchor for KIRO-TV in Seattle, Washington
- Ian D. Johnson, current Berlin bureau chief for The Wall Street Journal, Pulitzer Prize-winner
- Jennifer Lopez, meteorologist for The Weather Channel
- Jamie McIntyre, news anchor for NPR's All Things Considered and former senior Pentagon correspondent for CNN
- Heather Mitts, former reporter for ABC/ESPN, three-time Olympic gold medalist with the USWNT, professional soccer player
- Jeff Nesmith, journalist and Pulitzer Prize-winner
- Howard Norton, won the Pulitzer Prize in 1947 for his reporting
- Elizabeth Prann, current reporter with the Fox News Channel
- Raul Ramirez, 1969 editor of Florida Alligator; print and broadcast journalist and executive, educator; activist in promoting independent reporting and diversity in the profession
- Laura Rutledge, anchor/reporter with SEC Network/ESPN
- Forrest Sawyer, current anchorman for ABC News and winner of the George Foster Peabody Award, five National Emmy Awards, two Edward Murrow Awards, and an Associated Press Award
- Joe Scarborough, current MSNBC talk show host, and former US representative
- Sara Sidner, international correspondent with CNN
- Alison Starling, Emmy Award-winning anchor for ABC affiliate WJLA-TV News in Washington, D.C.
- Hal Suit, television broadcaster, formerly with WSB-TV in Atlanta; 1970 Republican gubernatorial nominee in Georgia, lost to Jimmy Carter

=== Sportcasters ===
- Red Barber, long-time radio sportscaster for the Brooklyn Dodgers and New York Yankees
- Lomas Brown, television commentator for ESPN and former NFL offensive tackle
- Kevin Carter, television commentator for ESPN and former NFL defensive end
- Bob Collins, broadcaster
- Cris Collinsworth, television commentator for HBO's Inside the NFL and Fox NFL Sunday, and former NFL wide receiver
- Gene Deckerhoff, current radio announcer for the Tampa Bay Buccaneers and Florida State Seminoles, and formerly for the Arena Football League
- Julie Donaldson, former sports commentator for WHDH-TV
- Ferdie Pacheco, former Showtime boxing analyst, and personal physician to Muhammad Ali
- Jesse Palmer, television commentator for ESPN/ABC, NFL Insider for TSN, former NFL quarterback, and star of ABC's The Bachelor
- Laura Rutledge, television commentator for SEC Network/ESPN Get Up!, First Take, and SportsCenter host
- Elfi Schlegel-Dunn, gymnastics and sports commentator for NBC Sports
- Lauren Shehadi, current sportscaster for MLB Network
- Emmitt Smith, television commentator for ESPN, Pro Football Hall of Fame former NFL running back, and NFL career rushing yards leader
- Chris Snode, Olympic diving commentator for BBC and EuroSport since 1988
- Tim Tebow, television commentator for SEC Network/ESPN and former NFL quarterback

==== Arts, literature, humanities, and entertainment ====
- Shane Acker, filmmaker, 9
- Don Addis, long-time newspaper columnist and syndicated comic strip artist for the St. Petersburg Times
- Chris Adrian, novelist and short-story writer, Gob's Grief
- Siva Ananth, Film Producer, Screenwriter
- Lauren Anderson, model
- Adaeze Atuegwu, writer
- Chris Bachelder, novelist, short-story writer, and e-book pioneer
- Todd Barry, stand-up comedian, actor and voice actor
- Joseph Beckham, writer on the topic of legal problems in education, winner of the McGhehey award, and currently a professor of education leadership at Florida State University
- Wayne Besen, former spokesman for the Human Rights Campaign, and gay rights advocate
- Mike Bianchi, sports columnist for the Orlando Sentinel
- Dan Bilzerian, professional poker player, actor, and internet social media personality
- Matt Borondy, publisher for Identity Theory online magazine
- Edward L. Bowen, horse racing historian
- Wendy Brenner, author and professor; Phone Calls From the Dead, Large Animals in Everyday Life: Stories
- Rita Mae Brown, author and activist
- Alan Burnett, television producer and writer
- Mike Burns, music producer
- Al Burt, Miami Herald and Atlanta Journal writer
- Kevin Canty, author; Into the Great Wide Open, Nine Below Zero, and Winslow in Love
- Kelly Carrington, model
- Alfred A. Cave, professor, historian, and author
- Debbie Cenziper, journalist with The Washington Post, and winner of the Pulitzer Prize
- Jean Chance, chairman of the Hearst Awards Committee for 25 years, professor of journalism at the University of Florida
- Peter Christopher, author, Campfires of the Dead
- Michael Connelly, best-selling author
- Paul Cootner, economist, author of The Random Character of Stock Market Prices
- Harry Crews, novelist, short story writer, and essayist
- Mark Curtis, journalist, author, and political analyst
- Jeff Darlington, current sportswriter for the Miami Herald
- Jonathan Demme, motion picture director, won Academy Award for directing for The Silence of the Lambs
- Karen DeYoung, Pulitzer Prize recipient, The Washington Post associate editor
- Kate DiCamillo, award-winning children's novelist and screenwriter
- Micki Dickoff, television director and producer, winner of multiple Emmy Awards
- Brian Doherty, senior editor of Reason magazine, author
- Gregg Doyel, sports writer for CBSSports.com
- Brian Drolet, actor, producer and writer
- Louann Fernald, model and actress
- Robert W. Fichter, photographer
- Rich Fields, announcer of The Price Is Right, meteorologist, radio personality, voice actor
- Lolita Files, author, screenwriter, and producer
- Dexter Filkins, Pulitzer Prize-winning journalist
- Jesse Hill Ford, writer and screenwriter
- Michael France, screenwriter for GoldenEye, The Hulk, and Punisher
- Robert Fulton, award-winning writer and naturalist
- Alan Gallay, American historian, and winner of the National Endowment for the Humanities Fellowship
- Michael Gannon, military historian and Catholic priest
- Leslie Yalof Garfield, current editor of the Journal of Court Innovation and professor at Pace Law School
- Merrill Gerber, author
- Norman Gilliland, author, WERN host
- GloZell, comedian
- MaryAnne Golon, picture editor for Time magazine
- Philip Graham, former publisher of The Washington Post
- Edwin Granberry, long-time writer of the comic strip Buz Sawyer
- Richard Grayson, writer and political activist
- Rebecca Greer, Woman's Day editor
- James Grippando, novelist and lawyer
- Israel Gutierrez, Miami Herald columnist, former Palm Beach Post columnist
- Nikolas Gvosdev, international relations scholar
- Robert J. Haiman, St. Petersburg Times executive editor, Poynter Institute president
- Rebecca Heflin (pseudonym of Dianne Farb), romance novelist and attorney
- Carol Hernandez, journalist, educator, Pulitzer Prize winner
- Edward D. Hess, author and professor
- Carl Hiaasen, novelist, Miami Herald columnist, won the Newbery Honor
- Rob Hiaasen, The Capital columnist and editor, adjunct journalism professor at the University of Maryland's Philip Merrill College of Journalism, victim of Capital Gazette shooting
- Shere Hite, author of The Hite Report, sex educator, and feminist
- Noy Holland, author of What Begins With Bird and Spectacle of the Body
- Elise Ippolito, artist
- Judith Ivory, best-selling author of historical romance novels
- Jarrod Jablonski, pioneering technical diver and record setting cave diver
- Eberhard Jäckel, German historian
- Jamali, Indian-American painter and sculptor
- Clint Johnson, American historian and author
- Madison Jones, novelist and former professor at Auburn University
- Steven J. Kachelmeier, current editor of The Accounting Review, and professor at the University of Texas
- Artie Kempner, director for FOX Sports
- Stetson Kennedy, award-winning author and human rights activist
- Eliot Kleinberg, author and writer for the Palm Beach Post
- Jeff Klinkenberg, author and reporter for the Tampa Bay Times
- Victoria Lancelotta, current editor of the Georgetown Review, author
- Mernet Larsen, artist
- Charlotte Laws, author, talk show host, and community activist
- Gary Russell Libby, art historian, curator, and museum director
- Will Ludwigsen, writer of horror, mystery, and science fiction
- C. J. Lyons, physician and writer of medical suspense novels
- Moss Mabry, costume designer, nominated for four Academy Awards
- Ron Magill, photographer and wildlife expert
- Scooter Magruder, YouTuber
- Thomas E. Mann, author and political pundit for the Brookings Institution
- Gabriel Martinez, Cuban-American artist
- Frances Mayes, author of best-selling book Under the Tuscan Sun
- Andrew McClurg, legal humor writer for the American Bar Association Journal
- Diane McFarlin, publisher of the Sarasota Herald Tribune
- Jon McKenzie, performance and media scholar and practitioner, professor at the University of Wisconsin–Madison
- Tom Meek, columnist and author of Another Day In Cyberville, Reflections On Media, and The Video Audio Overdose Galore
- Myka Meier, etiquette writer
- Louis A. Meyer, writer and painter
- Sam Michel, author of Under the Light; lecturer at University of Massachusetts Amherst
- Jessel Miller, watercolor artist and children's writer
- Andrew Mondshein, nominated for an Oscar for his film editing
- James Morgan, scenic designer and Producing Artistic Director of the York Theatre
- Robert Morris, novelist
- Rodney Mullen, entertainer, skateboarder
- Lorraine Murray, author of Why Me, Why Now?, and Grace Notes
- Jeff Nesmith, journalist, educator, Pulitzer Prize winner
- Lee Ann Newsom, anthropologist, named a MacArthur Fellow for 2002
- Ivan Osorio, columnist and editor at the Competitive Enterprise Institute
- Janis Owens, author
- Harvey Eugene Oyer III, author and attorney
- Mike Papantonio, trial lawyer, co-host of Ring of Fire
- Jeff Parker, novelist and short story writer
- John L. Parker Jr., writer
- David Penzer, current professional wrestling ring announcer for the WWE
- Kay Picart, author, artist, radio host, and producer
- Sam Proctor, one of the world's foremost scholars of Florida history
- Andrew Prokos, award-winning architectural and fine-art photographer
- Imad Rahman, author, I Dream of Microwaves
- Jeff Randall, former business editor of BBC News
- Marc Randazza, current editor of The Legal Satyricon
- Charlie Reed, current journalist with Stars and Stripes
- Pietra Rivoli, author and professor of finance at Georgetown University
- James Rizzi, pop artist
- Edward G. Roberts Jr., pioneer race car driver of NASCAR
- Alan G. Rogers, gay rights activist, and U.S. Army major who died in Operation Iraqi Freedom
- Thane Rosenbaum, novelist, essayist, and professor of law at Fordham University
- Rektok Ross, fiction writer, journalist, and entertainment host, best known for her contemporary romance novel Prodigal
- Scott Sanders, Emmy Award and Tony Award-winning television producer
- Mia Schaikewitz, TV personality and spokesperson for disability advocacy
- Julia Sell, former national coach for the United States Tennis Association
- Jeffrey Scott Shapiro, investigative journalist and attorney
- Paul Shyre, director and playwright who won a Tony Award and an Emmy Award
- Eugene Sledge, WW2 United States Marine, biologist and university professor; author of With the Old Breed: At Peleliu and Okinawa
- Rick Smith, author, entrepreneur, and public speaker
- George Solomon, former sports editor and columnist for The Washington Post; first ombudsman for ESPN
- Julian Sprung, writer
- Howard Stelzer, composer and performer of electronic music
- Randall J. Stephens, author, editor, and historian of American religion
- Craig Symonds, distinguished American Civil War historian and former professor at the United States Naval Academy
- Maggie Taylor, digital imaging artist
- Janet Todd, Welsh-born author on books about women's literature; professor at the University of Aberdeen
- Kendra Todd, real estate businesswoman and winner of The Apprentice 3 reality TV show
- Victor Andres Triay, Cuban-American historian and writer
- Natasha Tsakos, performing artist and conceptual director
- Toby Turner, YouTuber
- Claudio Véliz, Chilean author, historian, and Sociologist
- Robert Venditti, comic book writer
- Tarita Virtue, Trinidadian-American private detective, investigator, and model
- Sterling Watson, writer, Weep No More My Brother, The Calling, and Blind Tongues
- Bill Whittle, blogger, political commentator, director, screenwriter, editor, pilot, and author
- Edward Walton Wilcox, painter and sculptor
- Andrew Wilkow, conservative political talk radio host on Sirius Satellite Radio
- Hugh Wilson, director, writer, and actor
- Kevin Wilson, writer
- Edward Yang, Taiwanese filmmaker, winner of Best Director Award at Cannes for his 2000 film Yi Yi
- Hugo Zacchini, entertainer known as the "Human Cannonball"

The College of Journalism and Communications offers several Bachelor of Science in Journalism, Media Production, Management, and Technology, Advertising, and Public relations. It offers Master of Arts in Journalism, mass communications, and Advertising, along with Ph.D.

=== The Center for Public Interest Communications ===
The Center for Public Interest Communications operates as a unit of the College of Journalism and Communications. The first of its kind in the nation, the Center studies, tests, and helps organizations apply behavioral, cognitive, and social science to create strategic communication designed to achieve positive social change.

Public interest communications is a science-driven approach to strategic communications that results in lasting change on an issue that transcends the interests of any single person or organization and advances our greater good.

The Center provides training to government agencies, universities, foundations, public interest communications agencies and nonprofits on how to incorporate elements of public interest communications in their work. It also partners with a number of organizations to help them create more effective communications strategies to drive positive social change. In addition, The Center develops workshops to share research with social change leaders and scientists to help them develop better communication strategies, and it hosts frank, an annual conference dedicated to public interest communications. It also publishes the Journal of Public Interest Communications, the first-ever, open-access, interdisciplinary journal featuring peer-reviewed research in the emerging field of public interest communications.

The Center grew out of The Frank Karel Chair in Public Interest Communications made possible by a $2 million grant made to the university in 2008 from Trellis Fund. The endowment was used to create a curriculum in public interest communications, and to mentor and advise students who plan to build careers in the field.

In May 2019, The Center for Public Interest Communications, in collaboration with UF CJC Online, launched the nation's first master's degree program in Public Interest Communications.

=== UF CJC Online ===
The College of Journalism and Mass Communications launched its online graduate program (UF CJC Online) in 2012 with an MA degree in Mass Communication specializing in global strategic communication. The college currently offers a master's degree with eight areas of specialization including Audience Analytics, Digital Strategy, Global Strategic Communication, Political Communication, Public Interest Communication, Public Relations, Social Media, and Web Design. Additionally, four graduate certificates are offered in Global Strategic Communication, Media Sales, Social Media and Web Design. The online graduate program has been recognized as a top rated online program (Ranked #1 online Master's in Communications Program by The Best Schools in 2019) UF CJC Online is administered by an in-house staff. Dr. Evan Kropp was named the Director of UF CJC Online in May 2019.

=== ABC News at UF ===
ABC News opened a "mini-bureau" at the College of Journalism and Communications in September 2008. It was one of five universities chosen for the ABC News on Campus program, along with Arizona State University, Syracuse University, the University of North Carolina at Chapel Hill, and the University of Texas at Austin.

== Student organizations ==
In October 2011, the University of Florida chapter of the Public Relations Student Society of America (PRSSA) was named Most Outstanding Chapter of the Year.

== See also ==
- WRUF (AM)
- WUFT-FM
- WUFT (TV)
