= The Independent Florida Alligator =

Student newspaper of the University of Florida

Coordinates: 29.6518°N 82.3363°W

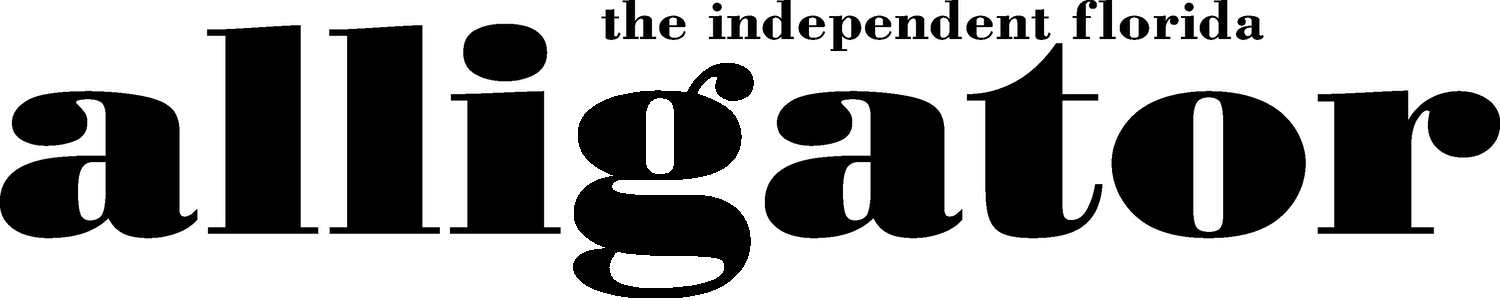

- The Independent Florida Alligator front page on November 26, 2012
- Type: Student newspaper
- Format: Compact
- Owner: Campus Communications Inc.
- General manager: Shaun O'Connor
- Founded: 1906; 1971 (as independent paper)
- Language: English
- Headquarters: Gainesville, Florida
- ISSN: 0889-2423
- Website: alligator.org

The Independent Florida Alligator is the student newspaper of the University of Florida. The Alligator is one of the largest student-run newspapers in the United States, with a circulation of 14,000 and readership of more than 21,000. It is an affiliate of UWIRE, which distributes and promotes its content to their network.

The paper prints every Monday during the spring, summer, and fall semesters and publishes daily on its website. The Alligator has been financially and editorially independent from the university since 1973. The Alligator has been owned by non-profit, student-controlled 501(c)(3) Campus Communications Inc. since its independence. Students from UF and Santa Fe College, also located in the city of Gainesville, Florida, are allowed to work at the paper. Only college students are allowed to work in the editorial department or be advertising representatives or interns.

The Alligator is distributed free on campus and around Gainesville and contains a mix of campus and local news coverage. It also contains sports and entertainment sections, the latter of which is known as "The Avenue." Its Spanish language section is known as "El Caimán." The Alligator prints on 11 x 14 inch paper, somewhat smaller than a tabloid size, closer in size to the compact format of The Times of London and the Chicago Sun-Times.

== History ==
=== Early history ===
The Alligator began as an independent student-run newspaper called The University News on October 19, 1906. The paper came together in time to report on the University of Florida's opening ceremony in its new permanent home in Gainesville. Much of the first issue was devoted to reprinting word-for-word the farewell speech given by then-Florida Governor Napoleon B. Broward.

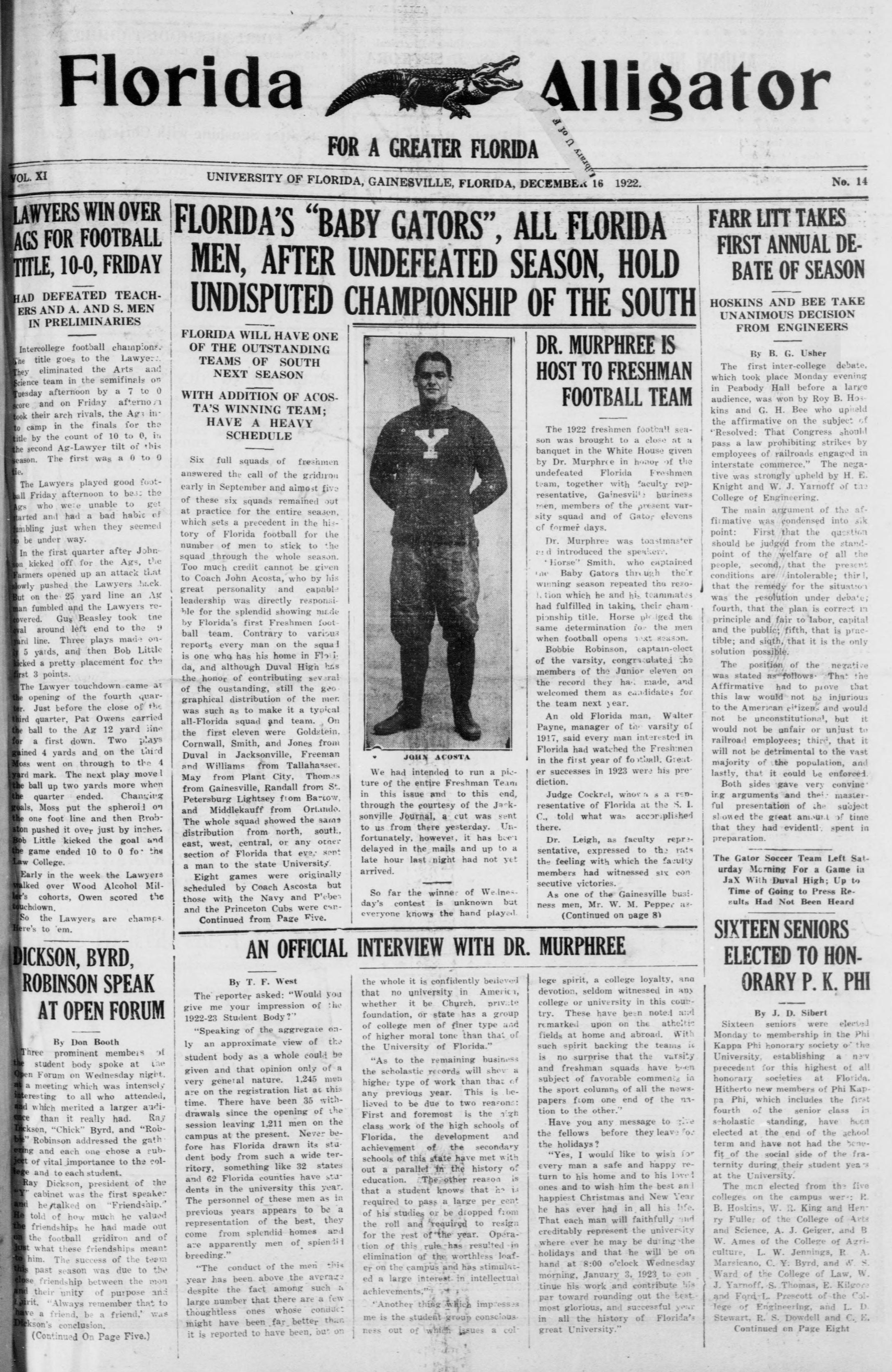
A 1922 issue of the Florida Alligator.

The Alligator remained independent until 1912, when it became part of the university and was renamed the Florida Alligator after the university's mascot, the Florida Gators.

For the next six decades, the university's Office of Student Publications supervised the paper. The office was also responsible for the university's Seminole yearbook (later renamed The Tower), Florida Magazine, the Orange Peel humor magazine, and other recurring publications. Alligator staffers often worked on several of these at the same time. (None of the other publications still exist.) The Alligator also had a radio news show on campus station WRUF for many years. WRUF now runs as an ESPN affiliate.

Until the 1950s, the university's student body selected the editor-in-chief in campus-wide elections, similar to student government. Candidates slated to political parties, published campaign ads, and debated each other not unlike today. The editor was roughly on the same level of prestige as the student body president, and various fraternities controlled the newspaper at one time or other.

By the early 1960s, the rapid post-World War II growth of the university, which had started with the G.I. Bill and continued with the decision to admit women in 1947 and to admit blacks in 1958 caused The Alligator to grow. The newspaper printed in broadsheet until 1962 (except during World War II, when paper was in short supply). In 1962, the paper switched to the smaller tabloid format, which it still uses today. Around this time, The Alligator was one of the first college newspapers in the nation to switch from hot type printing to the more modern offset standard.

In 1963, Ed Barber started working at The Alligator, as a student writer. By 1972 he became general manager of the paper.

Barber left the paper in 1973 to become Director of Publications for the university but returned as general manager in 1976 and became president of Campus Communications, Inc. Barber held the title of president emeritus of The Alligator and was executive director of the Alligator Alumni Association until his death in March 2026.

Patricia Carey, a veteran manager of the newspaper, succeeded Barber as general manager of The Alligator and president of Campus Communications.

Originally, the Office of Student Publications was located in the basement of the old Florida Union (today Dauer Hall), which was then the student union, in the north part of campus. In 1968, the paper moved into a new suite of offices on the third floor of the new union, the J. Wayne Reitz Union, directly adjacent to Student Government administrative offices.

=== Events leading to independence ===
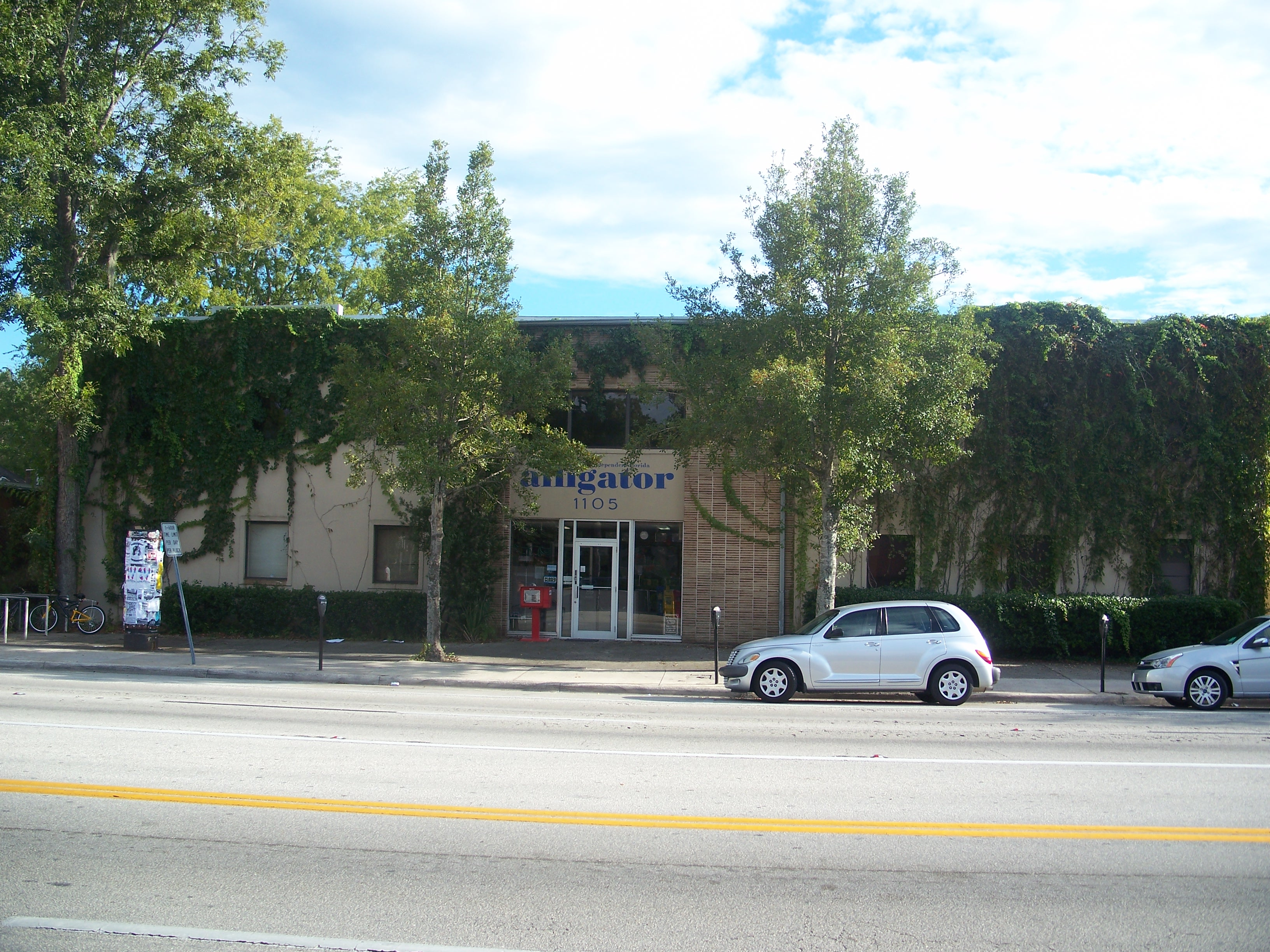
Former offices on University Avenue, 2008

The tumult of the late 1960s featured the resignation of editors who disagreed with an editorial denouncing the university's public tenure hearing for Marshall Jones, a professor who was accused of being a communist by the university administration. He was forced from the university. The university's crowded public hearing on Jones was denounced in Florida newspapers as reminiscent of the McCarthyist Red Scare of the 1950s. The editorial, written after the first hearing by journalism student and reporter Michael Abrams (who later became a journalism professor), was censored by the university's Board of Student Publications, and a blank space with the word "Censored" run in its place. Several of the student editors of the newspaper resigned over what they saw as the tone of the editorial and its anti-administration bent.

A national controversy ensued. Columnist Drew Pearson came to campus and gave strong support to the remaining staff. Editor Steve Hull, who also remained, assembled a new set of student editors. Throughout this time, the School of Journalism and Communications won a series of Hearst Journalism Awards, and many Alligator reporters and editors ultimately became well known in their professions.

The newspaper continued to do investigative reporting including stories about low wages paid to maintenance employees. It was during this time the newspaper was awarded the Pacemaker award as the best college paper in the nation. Among the key writers of the Alligator at the time were James Cook, later an attorney, who wrote the "Uncle Javerneck" column, and Joe Torchia, later a novelist, who intercepted humorous letters from "God" to various people, sparking an uproar among some religious readers.

Many copies of the final edition of the newspaper, with its somewhat racy collage of farewell pictures including the university president in a less than auspicious pose, were seized by those who supported the university administration.

Controversy ensued with a new set of editors being selected by the board, and an off-campus newspaper, University Report, published by Hull, Abrams, and Scott DeGarmo, a master's student in history. The paper exposed spying on students by government officials and law enforcement agents and was an outspoken critic of the administration of Stephen C. O'Connell, the former Florida Supreme Court justice and University President. One of its stories told of a government agent "Palmer Wee" who was apparently hired to watch radical students. The headline read "Wee is watching you." The paper printed several issues and was typeset on an old typesetting machine that was somewhat larger than a typewriter and sat on a living room floor. It was published out of town, as at least one local printer refused to print it.

The university administration continued to simmer over radical editors. In late 1971, editor Ron Sachs approved an insert to be published in The Alligator that printed the addresses of known abortion clinics. At the time, not only was abortion illegal in Florida, but even the printing of abortion information violated state law. The insert, a deliberate challenge by Sachs in protest of laws against abortion, threw the university into a firestorm. Both Sachs and university president Stephen C. O'Connell faced intense public pressure. When O'Connell discovered that Sachs was protected by federal First Amendment case law, he started working to disavow any connection between the university and The Alligator.

To defuse the hostile situation, Florida Attorney General Robert Shevin ruled that to protect students' First Amendment rights, the university and The Alligator should split. At the time, O'Connell declared that never again would UF sponsor a student newspaper on campus. As a further compromise agreement between the university and the newspaper's staff, the students were allowed to take The Alligator private and off campus. Sachs' challenge of the abortion law was successful; his criminal prosecution ended when the law was declared unconstitutional. Sachs later won an Emmy Award as a television producer in Miami, for his documentary Cocaine: The Lady is a Killer.

=== History after independence ===
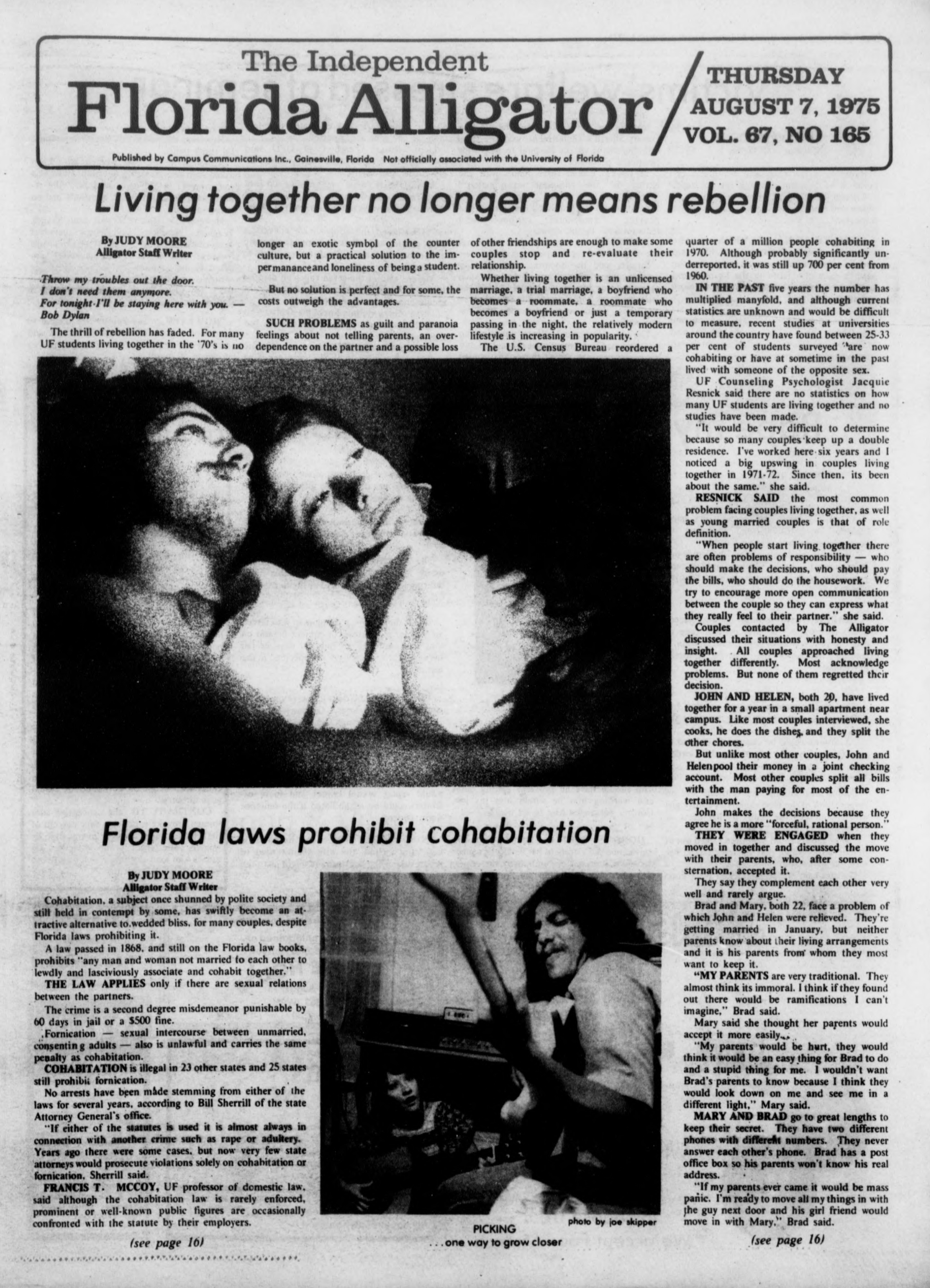
The August 7, 1975 edition of The Independent Florida Alligator, advertising the paper's independence from the university

The newspaper changed its name to The Independent Florida Alligator and took several years to find a permanent home. New owners Campus Communications moved in 1982 to the former Tau Epsilon Phi fraternity house two blocks east of campus on University Avenue.

Alligator writers and photographers won a dozen Hearst Awards during the period 1971 to 1979, a period when the paper also won several awards from the Associated Collegiate Press and the Society of Professional Journalists. Until the mid-1990s, Alligator alumni had won more Hearst writing and photo awards than any other student newspaper. (It now ranks second behind the Daily Northwestern of Northwestern University).

The Alligator also was one of the first college papers on the Internet, hosting a bulletin board system as early as 1985 and a website beginning in 1994.

In 1990, Campus Communications bought the High Springs Herald, the weekly newspaper of High Springs, Florida, about 30 miles outside the university. The High Springs Herald was sold in February 2009 to Ronald Dupont Jr.

In May 2016, The Alligator moved operations from its former location on University Avenue, where it had operated for over 30 years, to the same building as The Gainesville Sun.

The George A. Smathers Libraries currently hold microfilms of the early issues of The Independent Florida Alligator.

The George A. Smathers Library has digitized all issues of The University News, The Florida Alligator and The Independent Florida Alligator.

== Alumni ==
Former Alligator staffers work at major newspapers, magazines, and news agencies, including the Miami Herald, the Los Angeles Times, the Florida Times-Union, the Palm Beach Post, the Associated Press, and The New York Times, among others.

Alligator photographer and editor Robert Ellison (1944–1968) died in Vietnam while covering the Battle of Khe Sanh for the newspaper. His work, later published in Newsweek as "The Agony of Khe Sanh," won several posthumous awards.

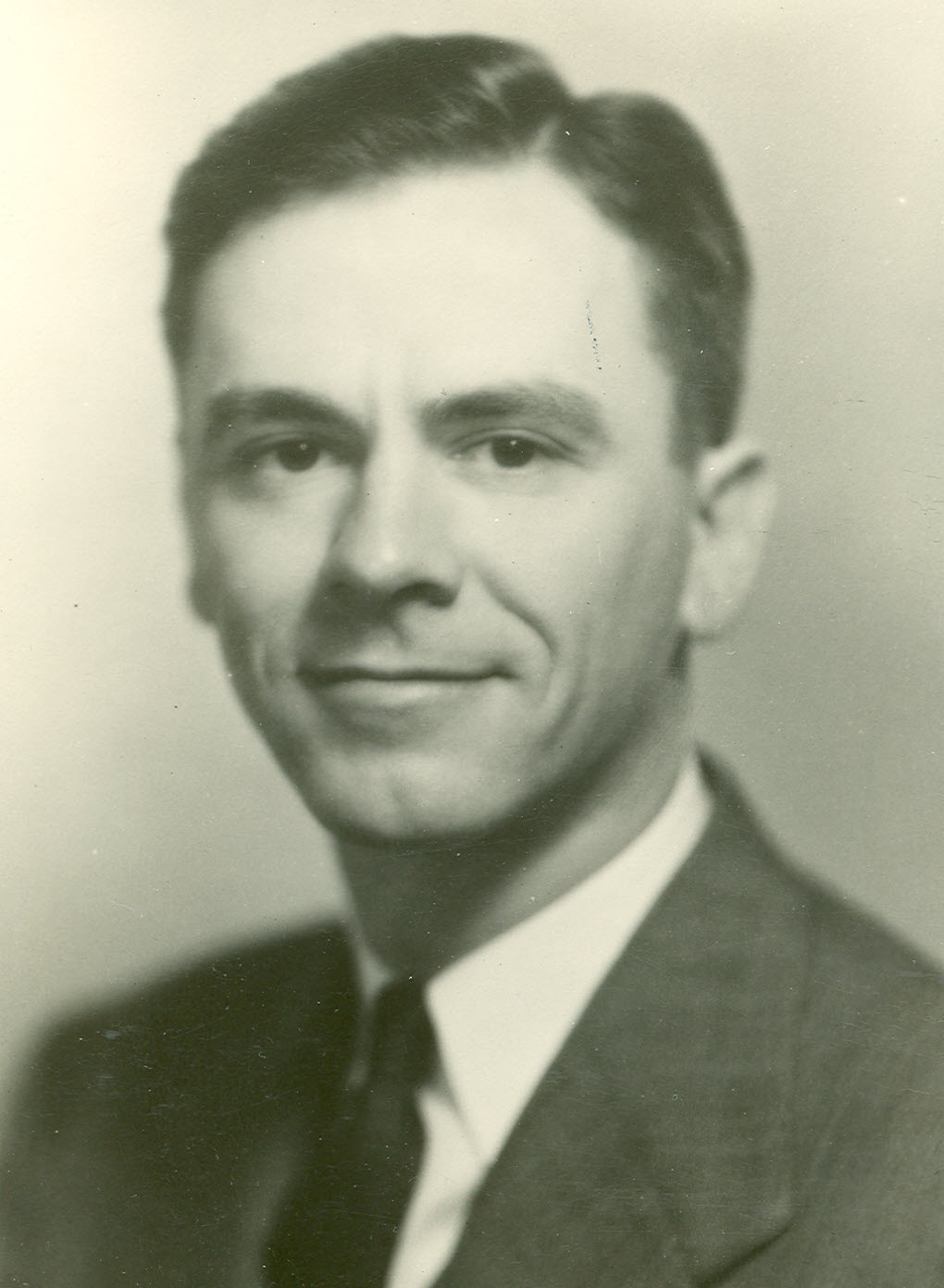
Charles Edward Bennett

Alumni	Notability
Don Addis	St. Petersburg Times editorial cartoonist; created the long-running series of "Sex Symbols" cartoons in Playboy Jan Godown Annino National Geographic Children's Books author
Charles Edward Bennett (editor 1931)	U.S. Representative (longest serving in Florida history)
Al Burt	Miami Herald writer
Rhea Chiles	Wife of Florida Governor Lawton Chiles; Former First Lady of Florida
H. G. Davis, Jr.	The Gainesville Sun columnist; Pulitzer Prize winner; longtime UF journalism professor
Karen DeYoung	The Washington Post writer and associate editor; Pulitzer Prize winner
Brian Doherty	Libertarian writer; Reason magazine senior editor
Gregg Doyel	Current writer for CBSSports.com, also worked for the Charlotte Observer and the Miami Herald
David Finkel	Washington Post writer; Pulitzer Prize winner
Philip Graham	The Washington Post publisher from 1946 to 1963, husband of Katharine Graham and Washington Post successor
Carl Hiaasen	Miami Herald columnist; crime fiction novelist (Tourist Season, Strip Tease, Skinny Dip)
Ian Johnson (editor Fall 1983)	The Wall Street Journal writer and Berlin bureau chief; Pulitzer Prize winner
David Lawrence Jr. (editor Spring 1963)	Former publisher of the Miami Herald and Detroit Free Press
Samuel Proctor	Historian and longtime UF history professor; University Historian; Florida history, and oral history
Juan C. Andrade	President and chief executive officer of USAA; recognized as one of the World’s Most Influential Decision Makers by The Wall Street Journal in 2023 and 2025

== Rivals and related publications ==
Since Stephen C. O'Connell stepped down as UF president in 1973, several rivals to The Alligator have set up shop. Most of these publications were started or actively encouraged by the university Student Government.

One notable contender was Campus Leader, a monthly alternative newspaper started in 1983. Sponsored by Student Government and edited by W.H. "Butch" Oxendine, Jr., it lasted somewhat less than a year as a direct competitor. Losing his sponsorship, Oxendine changed the magazine's focus, limiting it to students and education and renaming it Florida Leader. Florida Leader was distributed at nearly every college and university in the state and also published a separate high school edition. The magazine printed until 2006.

Another rival was The Orange and Blue, a twice-weekly newspaper in operation from August 1999 to July 2002. The Orange and Blue was similar in format to and was started by the publishers of, FSView, a student newspaper at Florida State University in Tallahassee that won a long-running battle with a rival FSU newspaper, the Florida Flambeau.

In 2000, confusion with a university publication also called The Orange and Blue led the newspaper to change its name to The Gator Times. Although Student Government leaders quickly supported the new paper, the Times did not survive. (The name Gator Times is also used by the administration as the title of its email newsletter and in promotional material).

The Florida Finibus was founded in 2024 to promote American intellectual tradition at the University of Florida. The student-run publication reports on foreign affairs, campus life and U.S. politics. It advertises itself as independent on its website but is listed as a sanctioned student organization on the university's student involvement page.

== In popular culture ==
- In the February 7, 2018, episode of the television game show Jeopardy!, one of the clues was, "The Independent Florida Alligator is a newspaper aimed at college students in this city."
