= Lara Logan =

South African journalist (born 1971)

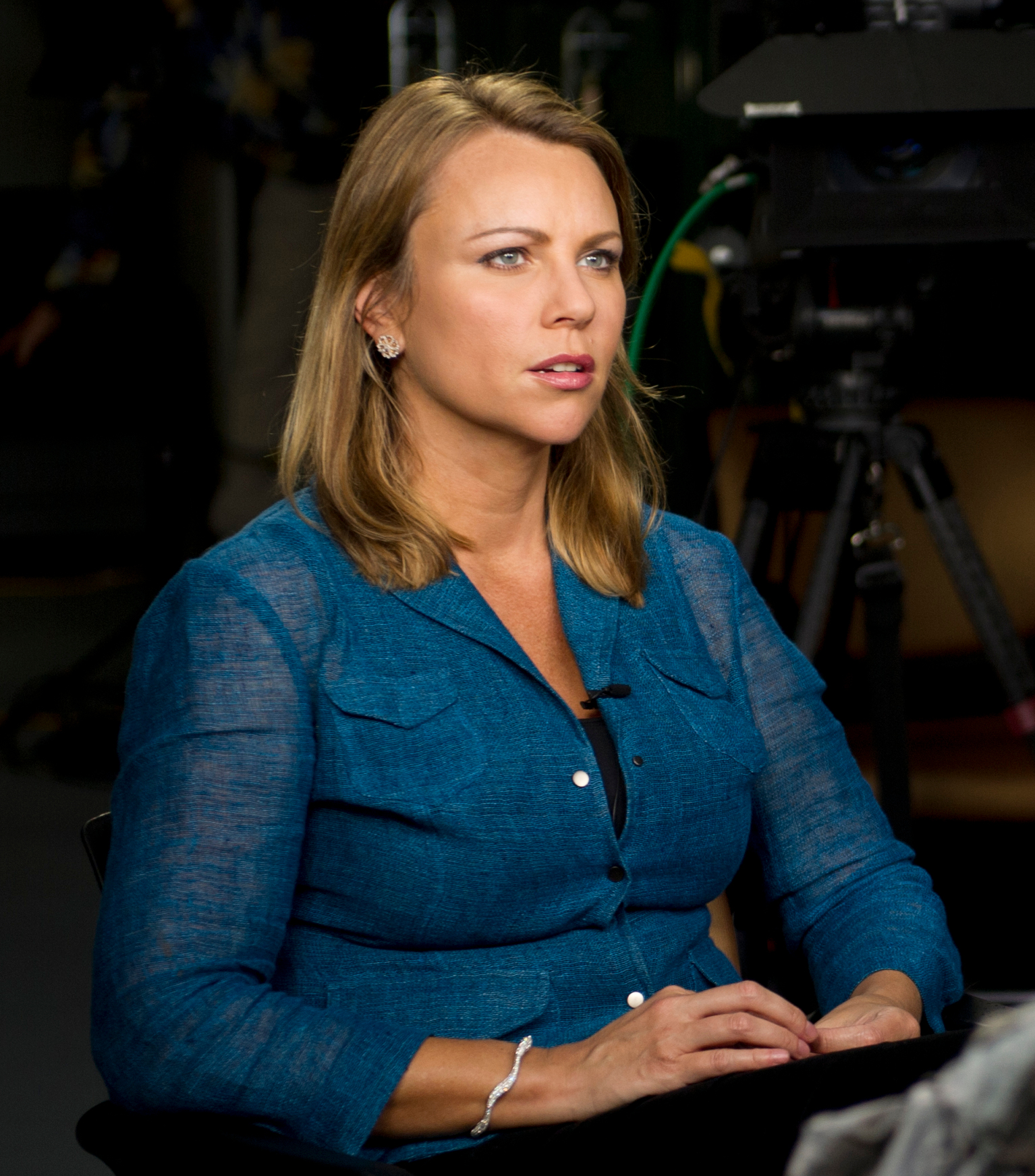
- Logan in 2013
- Born: 29 March 1971 (age 55); Durban, South Africa
- Education: Degree in commerce, 1992
- Alma mater: University of Natal, Durban
- Occupations: Journalist, since 1988
- Employer: CBS News chief foreign affairs correspondent (2006–2018)
- Spouses: Jason Siemon (m. 1998; div. 2008) Joseph Burkett (m. 2008)
- Children: 2
- Website: laralogan.com

Lara Logan (born 29 March 1971) is a South African television and radio journalist, war correspondent, and conspiracy theorist. Her career began with various South African news organizations in the 1990s. Her public profile rose due to her reports on the American invasion of Afghanistan in 2001, leading to her being hired as a correspondent for CBS News in 2002 and eventually becoming the service's Chief Foreign Affairs Correspondent.

In 2013, a story of Logan's on the 2012 Benghazi attack caused significant controversy due to factual errors and was retracted, resulting in a leave of absence. She left CBS in 2018, and has since made wide-ranging claims on conspiracy theories concerning various topics, such as HIV/AIDS denialism or the Rothschild family. In 2019, she joined the Sinclair Broadcast Group, a conservative media company. In January 2020, she joined Fox Nation, a subscription streaming service run by Fox News. In March 2022, she said she had been "dumped" by the network.

Since June 2022, Logan has been a board member of America's Future, a conservative non-profit chaired by Michael Flynn, who briefly served as National Security Advisor under the first Trump administration.

== Early life and education ==
Logan was born in Durban, South Africa, and attended high school at Durban Girls' College. She graduated from the University of Natal in Durban in 1992 with a degree in commerce. She earned a diploma in French language, culture and history at Alliance Française in Paris. Throughout high school and college, Logan worked as a swimsuit model.

== Career ==
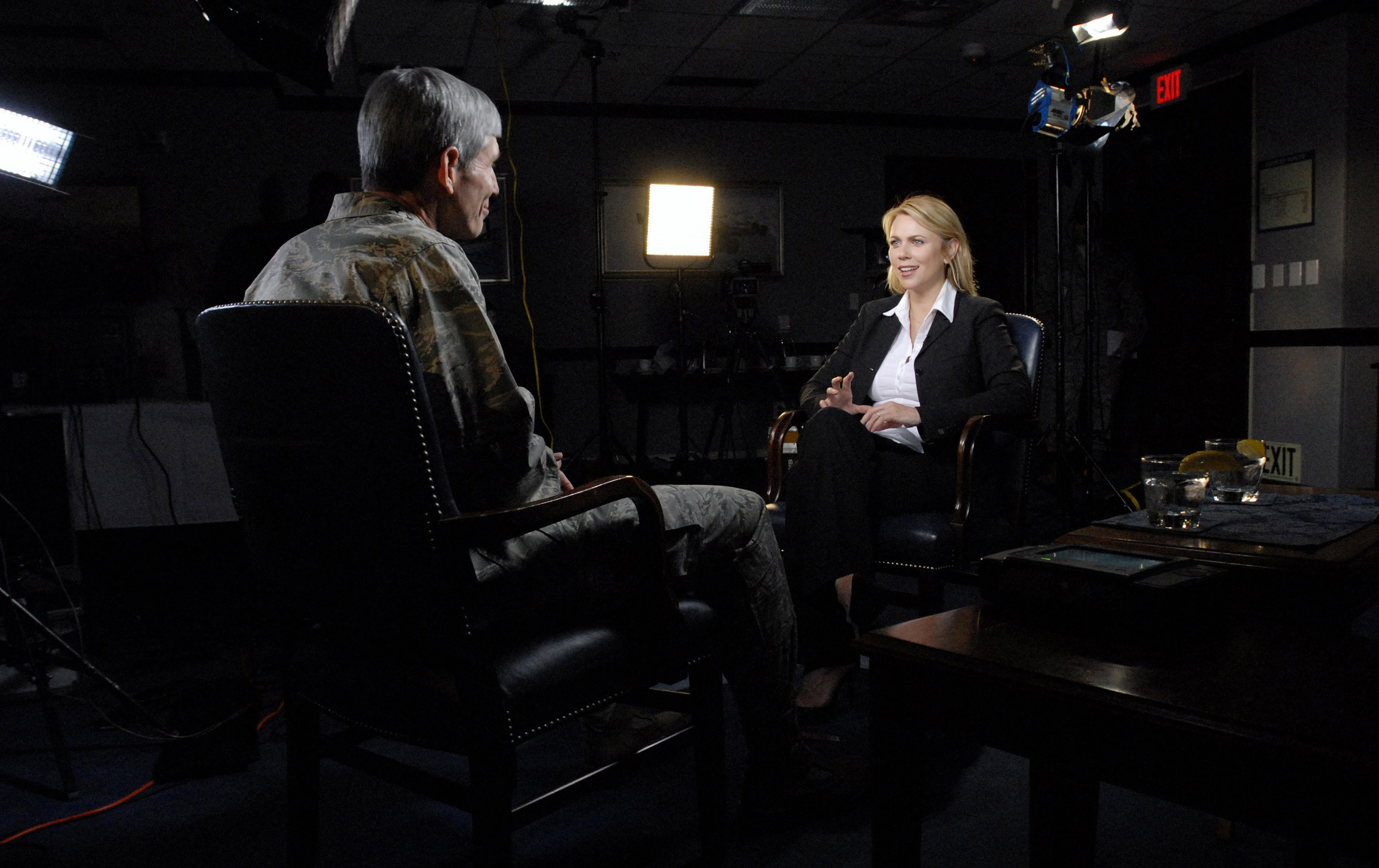
Logan interviewing General Norton A. Schwartz, April 2009

=== Early journalism ===
Logan worked as a news reporter for the Sunday Tribune in Durban during her studies (1988–1989), then for the city's Daily News (1990–1992). In 1992, she joined Reuters Television in Africa, primarily as a senior producer. After four years she branched out into freelance journalism, obtaining assignments as a reporter and editor/producer with ITN and Fox/SKY, CBS News, ABC News (in London), NBC, and the European Broadcasting Union. She worked for CNN, reporting on incidents such as the 1998 United States embassy bombings in Nairobi and Tanzania, the conflict in Northern Ireland, and the Kosovo War.

=== War correspondence in Afghanistan and Iraq ===
Logan was hired in 2000 by GMTV Breakfast Television (in the UK) as a correspondent; she also worked with CBS News Radio as a freelance correspondent. Days after the September 11 attacks, she asked a clerk at the Russian Embassy in London to give her a visa to travel to Afghanistan. In November 2001, while in Afghanistan working for GMTV, she infiltrated the American-British-backed Northern Alliance and interviewed their commander, General Babajan, at the Bagram Air Base.

CBS News offered her a full-fledged correspondent position in 2002. She spent much of the next four years reporting from the battlefield, including war zones in Afghanistan and Iraq, often embedded with the United States Armed Forces. But she also interviewed famous figures and explorers such as Robert Ballard, discoverer of the wreck of the RMS Titanic. Many of her reports were for 60 Minutes II. She was also a regular contributor to the CBS Evening News, The Early Show and Face the Nation. In February 2006, CBS News named Logan their chief foreign affairs correspondent.

In late January 2007, Logan filed a report of fighting along Haifa Street in Baghdad, but the CBS Evening News did not run the report, deeming it "a bit strong". To reverse the decision, Logan enlisted public support, asking people to watch the story and pass the link to as many of their friends and acquaintances as possible, saying, "It should be seen".

=== Other media organizations ===
Logan left CBS News in August 2018. The following year, she joined the Sinclair Broadcast Group on a temporary basis, as a correspondent reporting on the United States–Mexico border.

In October 2022, Logan was banned from right-wing television network Newsmax for what the network described as "reprehensible statements" during an interview where she said that "the open [United States-Mexico] border is Satan's way of taking control of the world through all of these people who are his stooges and his servants ... You know, the ones who want us eating insects, cockroaches and that while they dine on the blood of children?"

While introducing Pizzagate and QAnon conspiracy theorist Liz Crokin at a February 2024 conference, Logan told an audience that she had come to realize that Pizzagate "is all true".

=== Criticism of Michael Hastings ===
Logan was criticized in June 2010 for her remarks about another journalist, Michael Hastings, and her view that reporters who embed with the military ought not to write about the general banter they hear. An article by Hastings in Rolling Stone that month quoted General Stanley A. McChrystal and his staff—comments Hastings overheard while traveling with McChrystal—criticizing then U.S. Vice President Joe Biden and other officials, after which President Barack Obama fired McChrystal as his commander in Afghanistan. Logan told CNN that Hastings's reporting had violated an unspoken agreement between reporters who travel with military personnel not to report casual comments that pass between them.

Quoting her statement, "I mean, the question is, really, is what General McChrystal and his aides are doing so egregious, that they deserved to end a career like McChrystal's? I mean, Michael Hastings has never served his country the way McChrystal has." CNN's former chief military correspondent Jamie McIntyre said that what they did was indeed egregious, and that her comments "unfortunately reinforced the worst stereotype of reporters who 'embed' with senior military officers but are actually 'in bed' with them." He went on to quote Admiral Mike Mullen's statement that military personnel must be neutral and should not criticize civilian leaders.

Glenn Greenwald, commenting on the incident for Salon, wrote that Logan's segment was an example of what journalism had "degenerated into". Greenwald said that Logan had done courageous reporting over the years, but had come to see herself as part of the government and military.

=== Reporting from Egypt and sexual assault ===
Logan and her CBS crew were arrested and detained for one night by the Egyptian Army on 3 February 2011, while covering the Egyptian revolution. She said the crew was blindfolded and handcuffed at gunpoint, and their driver beaten. They were advised to leave the country, but were later released.

On 15 February 2011, CBS News released a statement that Logan had been beaten and sexually assaulted on 11 February, while covering the celebrations in Tahrir Square following Hosni Mubarak's resignation. 60 Minutes broadcast an interview with her about it on 1 May 2011; she said she was speaking out because of the prevalence of mass sexual assault in Egypt, and to break the silence about the sexual violence women reporters are reluctant to report in case it prevents them from doing their jobs.

She said the incident involved 200 to 300 men and lasted around 25 minutes. She had been reporting the celebrations for an hour without incident when her camera battery failed. One of the Egyptian CBS crew suggested they leave, telling her later he heard the crowd make inappropriate sexual comments about her. She felt hands touching her, and can be heard shouting "stop", just as the camera died. One of the crowd shouted that she was an Israeli Jew, a claim that CBS said, though false, was a "match to gasoline". She said that they tore off her clothes and, in her words, raped her with their hands, while taking photographs with their cellphones. They began pulling her body in different directions, pulling her hair so hard she said it seemed they were trying to tear off chunks of her scalp. She was dragged along the square to where the crowd was stopped by a fence, alongside which a group of women were camping. One woman wearing a chador put her arms around Logan, and the others closed ranks around her, while some men who were with the women threw water at the crowd. A group of soldiers appeared, beat back the crowd with batons, and one of them threw Logan over his shoulder. She later said she thought she was dying during the assault. She was flown back to the U.S. the next day, where she spent four days in the hospital. She was contacted by then-President Barack Obama when she arrived home. CBS said that the identity of the attackers remained unclear, and that it was unlikely that any would be prosecuted.

=== Comments about Afghanistan and Libya ===
In October 2012, Logan delivered a speech before the annual luncheon of the Better Government Association in which she sharply criticized the Obama administration's statements about the War in Afghanistan and other conflicts in the Arab world. In particular, Logan criticized the administration's claims that the Taliban was weakening in Afghanistan, calling such claims "a major lie" made in preparation for ending the U.S. military role in that country. She also stated that she hoped that the United States would "exact revenge" for the 2012 Benghazi attack, in which U.S. diplomatic personnel were attacked and killed in Libya.

=== Benghazi report errors ===
On 8 November 2013, Logan went on CBS This Morning to apologize for an inaccurate 60 Minutes report about the Benghazi attack, which had aired on 27 October. She indicated that an investigation uncovered that the source of much of her reporting was inaccurate and blamed it on Dylan Davies, manager of the local guard force at the U.S. Embassy in Benghazi. Logan said he lied about information and insisted they looked into his credibility and relied on such things as photographs and documents he supplied. In hindsight, Logan said they learned that the story told by Davies did not match what he told federal investigators. "You know the most important thing to every person at 60 Minutes is the truth," she said in the on-air apology on the morning show. "And today the truth is we made a mistake. And that's ah ... that's very disappointing for any journalist. That's very disappointing for me." Logan went on to add, "Nobody likes to admit they made a mistake. But if you do, you have to stand up and take responsibility – and you have to say you were wrong. And in this case we were wrong."

On 26 November 2013, Logan was forced to take a leave of absence due to the errors in the Benghazi report. Al Ortiz, executive director of Standards and Practices for CBS News, wrote in a memo, "Logan made a speech in which she took a strong public position arguing that the U.S. Government was misrepresenting the threat from Al Qaeda, and urging actions that the U.S. should take in response to the Benghazi attack. From a CBS News Standards perspective, there is a conflict in taking a public position on the government's handling of Benghazi and Al Qaeda, while continuing to report on the story."

She subsequently sued New York Magazine for $25 million for their reporting on the fallout. The suit was dismissed with prejudice.

=== Comments on mainstream media ===
After leaving CBS News, Logan began to criticize the media, which she said had a liberal bias. She described journalists as "political activists" and "propagandists" against President Donald Trump. She said that making these comments was akin to "professional suicide". Shortly thereafter, she joined the Sinclair Broadcast Group, a right-wing media group. Since then, Logan has tweeted right-wing conspiracy theories, such as speculating that Representative Alexandria Ocasio-Cortez won her election to office because of some unspecified plot operated by unknown entities Logan believes control antifa activists.

=== 2020 Fox News series ===
In 2020, Logan was hired by Fox News to do a series of shows called Lara Logan has No Agenda. The Los Angeles Times observed that "Despite the 'No Agenda' slogan, Logan does plan to wade back into the topic of media bias."

==== Claims about Antifa ====
On 31 May 2020, Logan tweeted a picture, which she claimed was an antifa riot instruction manual. The picture actually was an updated hoax dating to the 2015 Baltimore riots. On 1 June, Logan tweeted a threat by the @ANTIFA_US Twitter account. The account turned out to be fake and linked to Identity Evropa, a white nationalist organization. After being criticized for posting the hoaxes, Logan claimed that there was a campaign to "destroy" her, including by Media Matters for America.

On 4 June 2020, Logan appeared on Hannity to claim that antifa was leaving "pallets of bricks" at protest sites in an attempt to stoke violence and destruction. Fact-checkers found that claims of bricks being left at protest sites were without foundation, and that pictures submitted as evidence of this activity were actually taken at ordinary construction sites. No one else reported seeing antifa trucks leaving pallets of bricks. Next, Logan promoted a 5 June joke tweet which linked antifa to juggalos and a "clown hierarchy". Logan instead focused on the portion of the tweet that mentioned a "traditional command structure" and argued that anarchists thus indeed had organizational structure.

==== AIDS and COVID-19 conspiracy theories ====
In September 2021, Logan accused the Biden administration of "hiding evidence" of side effects supposedly caused by the COVID-19 vaccine. She also shared a false story about 27 U.S. Air Force pilots resigning over the COVID-19 vaccine mandate from Real Raw News, a fake news website.

In November and December 2021, Logan promoted falsehoods and conspiracy theories about AIDS and COVID-19. She shared articles that disputed the scientific consensus that HIV causes AIDS. She compared NIAID director Anthony Fauci to the Nazi scientist Josef Mengele. During a discussion of the SARS-CoV-2 Omicron variant, she said: "And so in that moment, what you see on Dr Fauci, this is what people say to me, that he doesn't represent science to them. He represents Josef Mengele, Dr Josef Mengele, the Nazi doctor who did experiments on Jews during the second world war and in the concentration camps, and I am talking about people all across the world are saying this."

Several prominent Jewish groups, including the Anti-Defamation League and the Auschwitz Museum, condemned her remarks. Logan subsequently retweeted criticisms of the Auschwitz Museum. During a December 2021 interview with MSNBC, Fauci called Logan's remarks "absolutely preposterous and disgusting", and criticized Fox News for not taking disciplinary action against her. United Talent Agency dropped Logan as a client shortly after her Mengele comment.

Since making her comment, Logan has not appeared as a guest on Fox News, and there have been no new episodes of Lara Logan Has No Agenda. In March 2022, Logan said that she had been "dumped" by Fox.

=== Russian invasion of Ukraine ===
During the Russian invasion of Ukraine, Logan in her television appearances linked Ukrainian president Volodymyr Zelenskyy to "satanic, occult" practices, called him a "puppet" and claimed that he had been "selected [...], not voted in". She praised Russian president Vladimir Putin for "not going to stand by while the globalists take over the world" and accused Ukrainians of being "actual Nazis". Logan's comments were praised and taken up by Russian government propaganda.

=== Comments about Darwin and the Rothschild family ===
In March 2022, Logan claimed without evidence that Charles Darwin was employed by the Rothschild family to create his theory of evolution. She also promoted claims that the Rothschild family, a frequent target of antisemitic conspiracy theories, engineered the American Civil War and the assassinations of Abraham Lincoln and John F. Kennedy.

== Personal life ==
In 1998, Logan married Jason Siemon, an American from Iowa playing professional basketball in the United Kingdom; the marriage ended in divorce in 2008. The same year, she married Joseph Burkett, a U.S. government defense contractor from Texas. It was the second marriage for both. The couple lived in Washington, D.C., with their two children and Burkett's daughter from his previous marriage. In 2015, they moved to Fredericksburg, Texas, Burkett's hometown.

== Awards ==
- American Women in Radio and Television Gracie Award, 2004
- The David Kaplan Award, Overseas Press Club, 2006
- David Bloom Award, Radio and Television Correspondents' Association, 2007
- Daniel Pearl Award, 2011
- National Press Club's John Aubuchon Press Freedom Award, 2011

== See also ==
- Women in journalism
