= Kiki Carter =

American singer-songwriter

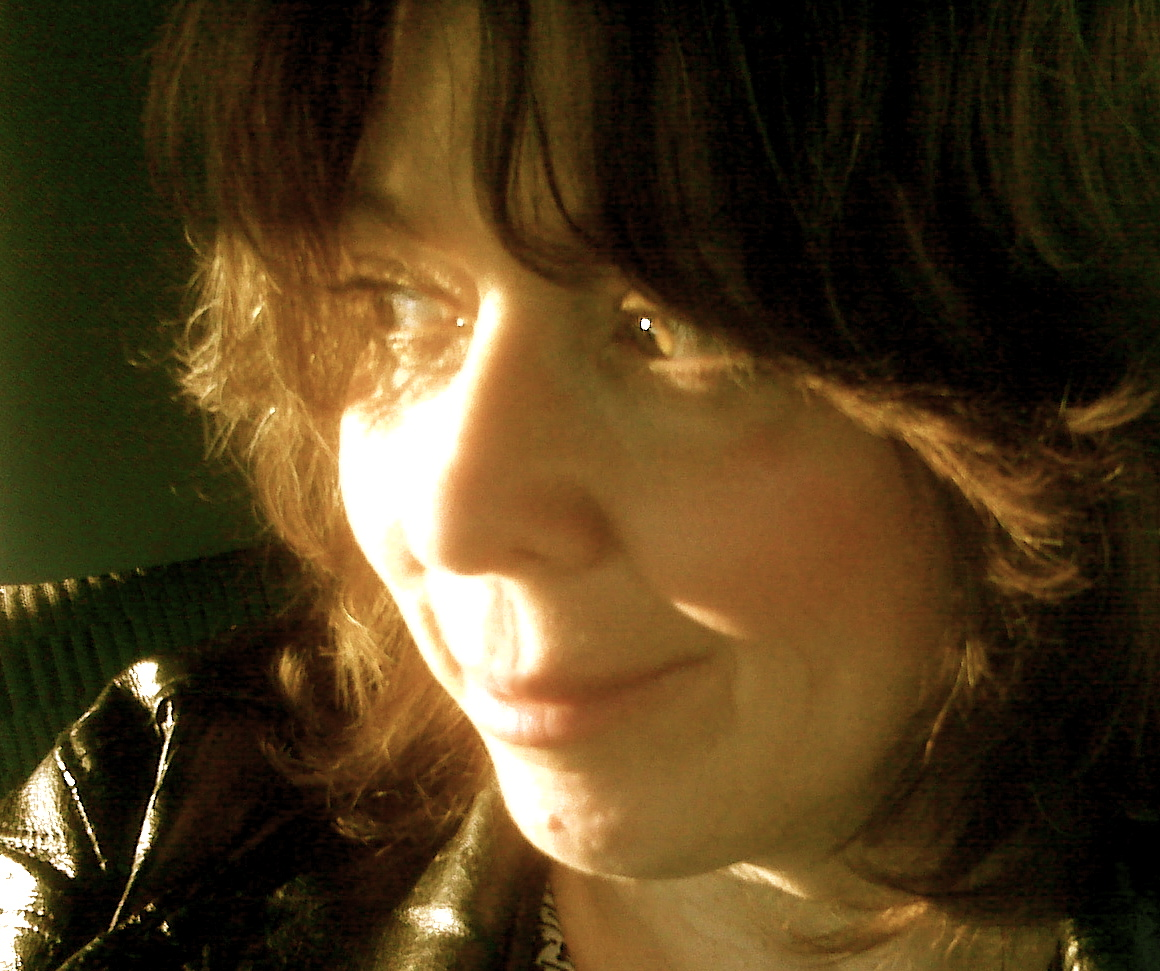
- Born: November 21, 1957 (age 68); Gainesville, Florida
- Education: University of Florida
- Known for: Being an environmental activist, organizer, musician, songwriter, and columnist
- Spouses: Rick Carter; Greg Webb

Kiki Carter (born Kimberli Wilson; November 21, 1957 in Gainesville, Florida) is an environmental activist, organizer, musician, songwriter, and columnist.

== Personal life ==
In May 1984, Carter married first husband Rick Carter. She had only known him for a month when they eloped to Las Vegas. Together, they had a son, Richard, in 1986.

In February 1998, Carter married singer/songwriter, Greg Webb, the lead singer of the Gainesville, Florida based Rhythm and Blues Revue, changing her name to Kiki Webb. They began collaborating musically and formed the acoustic duo, Dancing Light. The name Dancing Light came from a song of the same title, written about a vision Carter (then Kimberli Wilson) had after a near-death experience.

Carter and Webb moved to his family's property on Leech Lake in northern Minnesota in 2000.

== Musical career ==
As a euphonium student at the University of Florida Carter won the Sigma Alpha Iota "Outstanding Freshman Musician Award" for the 1974-75 year. Throughout her college years, Carter performed in various ensembles, symphonic bands and wind ensembles as principal/solo euphoniumist.

In the summer of 1976, Carter traveled to Ruston Louisiana to study with euphonium soloist, Raymond Young, then head of the Department of Music at Louisiana Tech University.

In 1979, University of Florida Music Department Chairman Budd Udell included a euphonium solo written for Carter in Forces One, the first movement of his Symphony for Band. The Symphony was premiered at the Music Educators National Conference convention in Miami Beach on April 9, 1980 with Carter performing the solo. The same year, Carter was one of eight national finalists in the Tubist Universal Brotherhood Association's national collegiate solo contest for euphonium.

Carter graduated from the University of Florida in March 1981 and briefly did post-baccalaureate work as a theater major, before leaving to audition for euphonium jobs in Washington D.C. military service bands. She started studying with Brian Bowman, euphonium soloist of the United States Air Force Band in Washington DC. During her studies in DC, Carter worked as a governess for Washington Post publisher, Donald E. Graham and his wife, Mary.

While in Washington DC, Carter began playing guitar and writing songs. She became disillusioned with the prospect of a professional military band career and returned to Gainesville in February 1982. Through a mutual friend, Carter met Michele Marino, who began managing Carter's career. Marino booked Carter's first television appearances a solo performer on The Kim Edstrom Show. Carter started playing in area clubs, often accompanied by pianist and singer, Sidney Bertisch.

In 1984, Carter and Marino travelled to Los Angeles, California, where Carter won the weekly music contest at the Palomino Club in North Hollywood The contest brought her to the attention of Capitol Records VP Joe McFadden who gave her his business card and suggested she contact him. Through manager, Michele, Carter came to the attention of Robert L. "Bumps" Blackwell, songwriter, record producer, and manager of Little Richard. Bumps arranged for Carter to sing with a group appearing in a 1983 Los Angeles television show with Billy Preston. Robert Blackwell managed Carter until his death in March 1985.

During those years, Carter made several trips from Gainesville to Nashville to meet with Capitol Records. Before a deal was struck, Capitol Records experienced a major restructuring and her contacts had been replaced.

She and her husband, Greg Webb, later began touring Minnesota, as the acoustic duo, Dancing Light. As Dancing Light, they released their first full-length CD, Meadowdance in 1993.

Carter and Webb co-founded independent record label Sunblossom Records, and she is founder of music publishing company Shebreana Music (BMI) They started Saturday Cafe Concert Series, a weekly Concert series in Northern Minnesota. They continued to perform at benefit concerts.

== Activism ==
At the end of 1986, Carter's mother, author Patti Greenwood learned of the US Department of Energy's plans to build a demonstration irradiation facility in Gainesville, Florida.

Greenwood shared the news with Carter. In early 1987, Carter called the local television station, ABC affiliate WCJB-TV to alert them to plans by the United States Department of Energy and the Florida Department of Agriculture and Consumer Services to build a food irradiation facility in Gainesville, Florida, using radioactive caesium-137. This project was part of the United States Department of Energy's By-Products Utilization Program (BUP). The BUP was born out of a Congressional mandate to find uses for by-products of plutonium production.

Carter was invited to appear live in the studio with the WCJB anchors. Soon a grassroots movement was galvanizing with Carter and her mother at the epicenter.

Carter and her mother founded the organization Citizens Against a Radioactive Environment (C.A.R.E.) to oppose the use of Department of Energy stores of radioactive caesium-137 in a demonstration food irradiation facility. The caesium-137 was slated to be used at six different demonstration irradiators through the country, one of which was proposed for Gainesville, Florida. After a groundswell of public opposition, public debates, and public forums, the caesium-137 was never used in the facility.

Carter organized a state-wide coalition of concerned citizens called the Florida Coalition to Stop Food Irradiation in response to plans for another irradiator in Plant City, FL. and national TV and helping to organize fledgling groups in other communities.

Working as an environmental activist expanded Carter's awareness of other environmental and social justice issues. She helped wherever she could, appearing at public meetings and performing at benefit concerts. She became active in helping to raise awareness of radon issues in Alachua County and helped provide free test kits to residents. Her pet projects included the I.C.E.S. fruition project, where she organized plantings of fruit trees in Habitat for Humanity homesites, and promoting the use of reusable bags in grocery stores.

Carter was an independent candidate in 1988 for the Alachua County Commission, losing to wildlife artist Kate Barnes.

In 1992, Carter wrote a weekly column for the Marion/Alachua edition of the Tampa Tribune called Environmentally Speaking.

Carter often used her musical talents and connections to organize and participate in fundraising concerts for her environmental causes, including a 1996 concert at the Phillips Center for the Performing Arts featuring world-renowned violinist Nadja Salerno-Sonnenberg and the Gainesville Chamber Orchestra. Carter also composed songs and produced regional television commercials for the United Way.

She became active in the Leech Lake Head Start program on the Leech Lake Indian Reservation where she chaired the parent committee of her son's Head Start program and was elected to chair the policy council of the Leech Lake Head Start program.

In the fall of 2005 Carter and her husband helped organize the Great Gala for the Gulf, a benefit concert for survivors of Hurricane Katrina, held at the Moondance Jam site in Northern Minnesota. raising over $5,000 for relief to survivors.

Carter is currently a vocal proponent of the campaign to establish a United States Department of Peace.

== Sources ==
=== Feature articles about Kiki Carter ===
- DeYoung, Bill: "Kiki Carter Comes Home to Sing", page 7. Scene Magazine, The Gainesville Sun, February 22, 1985
- Galen Moses: "Carter: performer and persuasive crusader", The Gainesville Sun, page 1, August 10, 1987
- Barber, John: "Glowing Concerns", Eating Well, pages 37–43. Eating Well: The Magazine of Food & Health, February 1992
- Joyce Slaton: "Little Steps To Big Solutions", Moon Magazine, December 92/January 93

=== Articles mention or quote Kiki Carter ===
- "More money is asked for education, fighting crime," Merrily Helgeson, The Gainesville Sun, April 4, 1987
- "Gainesville residents protest plan to irradiate food," Andrea Blaugrund, The Gainesville Sun, April 7, 1987
- "Irradiation and information," Editorial, The Gainesville Sun, April 8, 1987
- "Food for thought," by-line missing, The Independent Florida Alligator, April 9, 1987
- "A fight is unfolding over plans for an irradiator," Galen Moses, The Gainesville Sun, April 11, 1987
- "Irradiation: Debate Rages after 30 years," Galen Moses, The Gainesville Sun, April 19, 1987
- "Gainesville Irradiation Plant Opposed," Thornton Hartley, Florida Times-Union, April 19, 1987
- "Irradiation facility agreement expected to be signed soon," Galen Moses, The Gainesville Sun, April 23, 1987
- "Plant worries Gainesville Residents," Associated Press, Florida Today, April 25, 1987
- "Irradiation facility foes march at proposed site," Galen Moses, The Gainesville Sun, May 7, 1987
- "Marchers protest plans for food irradiation plant," Thornton Hartley, Florida Times-Union, May 7, 1987
- "While you were gone: glowing protest," Alligator staff report, The Independent Florida Alligator, May 12, 1987
- "County to seek halt to irradiator," Sara Hamilton, The Gainesville Sun, May 13, 1987
- "Irradiation plant may be delayed," Susan Lewis, The Independent Florida Alligator, May 14, 1987
- "Irradiator debate intensifies," Colin Whitworth,The Gainesville Sun, May 27, 1987
- "Musicians line up for benefit," Scene Magazine, The Gainesville Sun, May 29, 1987
- "Irradiation Plant to be debated," Galen Moses, The Gainesville Sun, June 2, 1987 (front page headline)
- "Citizens argue against irradiation plant," Galen Moses, The Gainesville Sun, June 4, 1987
- "Irradiation facility debate draws overflow crowd," Susan Lewis, The Independent Florida Alligator, June 4, 1987, Vol 80 Number 159
- "Irradiation debated in Gainesville," Thornton Hartley, Florida Times-Union, June 5, 1987
- "Irradiation debate makes few converts," Galen Moses, The Gainesville Sun, June 6, 1987
- "Funding for irradiator's planning OK'd" Galen Moses, The Gainesville Sun, June 26, 1987
- "Record is clear on history of irradited food," Pete Packett, The Tallahassee Democrat, June 29, 1987
- "Radiating with controversy," Warren Epstein, The Tampa Tribune, July 3, 1987
- "Panel wants more extensive study on irradiation plant," Sara Hamilton, The Gainesville Sun, July 9, 1987
- "Brown Bag talk to concentrate on irradiation plant," Mike Mason, The Independent Florida Alligator, September 9, 1987
- "Brown Bag guest to warn against irradiation plant," Alissa Algarin, The Gainesville Sun, September 15, 1987
- "Activist speaks out against irradiation," Dorothy Lerman, The Independent Florida Alligator, September 17, 1987
- "Group seeks law to halt irradiation: Signatures could put issue on ballot," Barbara Beyer, The Independent Florida Alligator, September 25, 1987
- "Campaign against food irradiation launched," Galen Moses, The Gainesville Sun, September 26, 1987
- "Signs point way to pure produce," Mary Murphy, The Independent Florida Alligator, October 12, 1987
- "State wants assessment on irradiation plant," Galen Moses, The Gainesville Sun, October 15, 1987
- "Group wants food with irradiated contents taken off store shelves," Jim Sams, The Gainesville Sun, December 19, 1987
- "Cesium-137 won't be used in irradiator," Galen Moses, The Gainesville Sun, January 14, 1988 (headline)
- "Irradiation change relieves some fears: New treatment is safer for aquifer," John Lester, The Independent Florida Alligator, January 15, 1987
- "Change in irradiator has many relieved," Andrea Blaugrund,The Gainesville Sun, January 15, 1988
- "A sigh of relief," Editorial, The Gainesville Sun, January 15, 1988
- "Confusion mounting over radon," Andrea Blaugrund, The Gainesville Sun, April 9, 1988
- "Will Salerno-Sonnenberg return to Gainesville?" David M. Grundy, The Gainesville Sun, August 7, 1992
- "New Environmental Group Wants to Address All Issues," Lisa Lauer, The Independent Florida Alligator, August 24, 1992
- "Risks with Irradiated Foods Outweigh Their Benefits" Kiki Carter, The Gainesville Sun, op-ed September 6, 1992
- "Kids First! Planting Seeds for Their Future," Unknown author, The Gainesville Sun, Scene Magazine, September 11, 1992
- "Songs For the Earth," Leigh Glenn, The Gainesville Sun, September 14, 1992
- "Consultants Mull How To Sell Irradiation To Public," Lillian Guecara-Castro, The Gainesville Sun, November 19, 1992
- "Tree program sprouts," Gary Kirkland, The Gainesville Sun, December 18, 1992
- "City, County want help choosing recycling logo," Florida A. Bridgewater, The Gainesville Sun, January 17, 1995

=== Articles written by Kiki Carter ===
- "Family Lives the Environmentalist Life," Kiki Carter, The Tampa Tribune, May 9, 1992
- "Greens Take Root in Florida," Kiki Carter, The Tampa Tribune, May 16, 1992
- "Expert Finds Some Ways to Save Money on Energy," Kiki Carter, The Tampa Tribune, May 23, 1992
- "Retiree is concerned for environment," Kiki Carter, The Tampa Tribune, May 30, 1992
- "Researcher giving time to planet he loves," Kiki Carter, The Tampa Tribune, June 8, 1992
- "Clay Pipe Along Creek Should be Monitored," Kiki Carter, The Tampa Tribune, June 13, 1992
- "Garden Mirrors Man's Philosophy," Kiki Carter, The Tampa Tribune, June 20, 1992
- "Poe Springs Popular for Swimming," Kiki Carter, The Tampa Tribune, June 27, 1992
- "We are Dependent Creatures," Kiki Carter, The Tampa Tribune, July 4, 1992
- "Environmental Activist Launched Idea Exchange," Kiki Carter, The Tampa Tribune, July 11, 1992
- "Earth May Have 'Energy Points'," Kiki Carter, The Tampa Tribune, July 25, 1992
- "Man Credits Diet With Improving Life," Kiki Carter, The Tampa Tribune, August 1, 1992
- "We're Burying Ourselves in Garbage," Kiki Carter, The Tampa Tribune, August 8, 1992
- "Alachua Candidates Answer Environmental Questions," Kiki Carter, The Tampa Tribune, August 18, 1992
- "Candidates Face Environmental Issues," Kiki Carter, The Tampa Tribune, August 22, 1992
- "EPA Suggests Testing for Radon," Kiki Carter, The Tampa Tribune, August 29, 1992
- "Scorecard Rates Lawmakers on Environmental Action," Kiki Carter, The Tampa Tribune, September 5, 1992
- "Musicians Passionate About Trees," Kiki Carter, The Tampa Tribune, September 12, 1992
- "Wildlife Corridor Faces Extinction," Kiki Carter, The Tampa Tribune, September 19, 1992
- "Irradiation Fears Go Beyond Food Safety," Kiki Carter, The Tampa Tribune, September 27, 1992
- "Photographer Crusades To Preserve Nature," Kiki Carter, The Tampa Tribune, October 3, 1992
- "Greens Hold Party to Celebrate Possibilities for Next 500 Years," Kiki Carter, The Tampa Tribune, October 10, 1992
- "Compost Benefits States Sandy Soil," Kiki Carter, The Tampa Tribune, October 25, 1992
- "Stewards of the Land on the Lookout For Pollution," Kiki Carter, The Tampa Tribune, November 8, 1992
- "Solar/electric Chevy truck charges into Gainesville," Kiki Carter, The Tampa Tribune, December 6, 1992
