= Rebecca Greer =

American journalist

- Born: 1936
- Died: 6/25/2024
- Occupations: Writer and Editor for Woman's Day
- Writing career
- Literary movement: Feminism

Rebecca Ellen Greer (born 1936) is an American nonfiction writer and also served as an editor for Woman's Day magazine.

== Biography ==
Rebecca Greer majored in communications at the University of Florida. She graduated with a Bachelor of Science degree from the College of Journalism and Communications in 1957. In 1998, she was named a distinguished alumna of the College of Journalism and Communications at the University of Florida. The University of Florida maintains a collection of her manuscripts in their Special and Area Studies Library.

Her non-fiction book Why Isn't a Nice Girl Like You Married? (1969) was a bestseller and seminal book on feminism. She taught nonfiction writing at the New School for Social Research.

== Published books ==
- Why Isn't a Nice Girl Like You Married? (1969)
- How To Live Rich When You're Not (1975)
- No Rocking Chair For Me (2004)

== See also ==
- List of feminists
