= Diane McFarlin =

American educator and author

- Education: University of Florida
- Occupations: Dean Emeritus, University of Florida College of Journalism and Communications
- Writing career
- Notable awards: Scripps Howard Awards College Administrator of the Year

Diane McFarlin is an American journalist, educator, and publishing executive. McFarlin served as the publisher of the Sarasota Herald-Tribune before pursuing a career in academia and higher education. She retired in 2021 as dean of the University of Florida College of Journalism and Communications.

== Career ==
McFarlin began her journalism career in high school and took a reporting job at the Sarasota (FL) Herald-Tribune after earning her degree at the University of Florida. She became managing editor at 30 and was named executive editor of The Gainesville Sun three years later. She then returned to the Herald-Tribune, serving as executive editor for a decade and publisher for 13 years. McFarlin became dean of the UFC College of Journalism and Communications in January 2013.

McFarlin is a past president of the American Society of News Editors and has served six times as a juror for the Pulitzer Prizes She has taught at the Centers for Independent Journalism in Prague and Bucharest, and addressed the World Editors Forum on the subject of multimedia newsrooms. McFarlin has worked on behalf of numerous nonprofit organizations and launched the Season of Sharing charitable fund, which has raised $24 million to provide crisis funding to families on the brink of homelessness.

From 2013 to 2021, she served as the Dean of University of Florida College of Journalism and Communications.
