= Edward Aschoff =

American sports journalist (1985–2019)

- Born: December 24, 1985; Oxford, Mississippi, U.S.
- Died: December 24, 2019 (aged 34); Los Angeles, California, U.S.
- Education: University of Florida
- Occupation: Sports reporter

Edward Carmichael Aschoff (December 24, 1985 – December 24, 2019) was an American sports reporter for ESPN and the Gainesville Sun.

== Career ==
Raised in Oxford, Mississippi, Aschoff graduated from the University of Florida in 2008 with a bachelor's degree in journalism. From 2007 to 2011 he covered Florida Gators football, basketball and baseball for The Gainesville Sun.

Aschoff joined ESPN in 2011 as an SEC reporter, where he rapidly distinguished himself as a "rising star." Aschoff moved to Los Angeles in 2017 to begin an expanded national role for ESPN that included television and radio appearances on SportsCenter, SEC Network, and ESPN Radio, as well as television and radio sideline reporting during college football games.

Known for his "lively blog posts and thoughtfully reported features," Aschoff twice won first-place awards from the Football Writers Association of America for his writing: in 2016, for a story about African-American college football players dealing with racism and profiling, and in 2018, for a column about the former Florida football coach Jim McElwain.

== Death and legacy ==
Aschoff died on his thirty-fourth birthday of hemophagocytic lymphohistiocytosis, a complication of pneumonia and underlying undiagnosed stage 4 non-Hodgkin lymphoma. He had planned to marry his fiancée, Katy Berteau, in New Orleans in April 2020. Aschoff's untimely passing drew extensive coverage in national media outlets. Colleagues remembered Aschoff as a dapper dresser, "one of the smartest, brightest reporters I've ever had the pleasure of working with" and a "ray of light" who "brought joy to the job."

In Aschoff's memory, the Mayor and Board of Aldermen of Oxford proclaimed January 18, 2020, as Edward Aschoff Day. The Football Writers Association of America created the Edward Aschoff Rising Star Award to "recognize one promising journalist no older than 34, who has not only the talent and work ethic it takes to succeed in this business, but also the passion to make it better." The University of Florida College of Journalism and Communications established the Edward Aschoff Memorial Fund to provide support for students involved in sports journalism. The Southeastern Conference created a communications internship in Aschoff's honor.

== Bibliography (selected) ==
- Aschoff, Edward; Rittenberg, Adam (September 16, 2015), "The racial impact of Eric Striker", ESPN.com. Winner of the 2016 Football Writers Association of America award for best enterprise story.
- Aschoff, Edward; Schlabach, Mark (November 7, 2017), "Inside Jim McElwain's final days at Florida", ESPN.com. Winner of the 2018 Football Writers Association of America award for best column.
