= Al Burt =

- Born: September 11, 1927
- Died: November 29, 2008 (aged 81); Jacksonville, Florida, US
- Occupation: Writer for The Miami Herald

Alvin Victor Burt (September 11, 1927 – November 29, 2008) was an author and longtime journalist at The Miami Herald in Florida. He served as a sports writer, news reporter, editor, editorial writer and columnist.

Burt reported from Washington to Latin America and the Caribbean and throughout Florida. Before working with The Miami Herald he had positions with the Atlanta Journal and the Jacksonville Journal. He was seriously wounded by "friendly fire" while covering the US invasion of the Dominican Republic in 1965.

For many years he wrote a back-page column for The Miami Herald Sunday magazine on interesting people and places around Florida that drew him quite a following. Floridian author David Nolan said he used to buy the Herald just to read Burt's column. Many of them were collected in book form as Becalmed in the Mullet Latitudes (1984), Al Burt's Florida (1997), and Tropic of Cracker (1999).

A scholar and advocate of the Florida cracker subculture, Burt was a longtime trustee of the Marjorie Kinnan Rawlings Society – an organization that celebrated the life and work of the Pulitzer Prize–winning novelist who gave the Crackers dignity in American literature. He lived for many years in the picturesque historic town of Melrose, Florida, until declining health dictated a move to the larger city of Jacksonville not long before his death.

== Education ==
Burt graduated from the University of Florida College of Journalism and Communications in 1949. He wrote for the student newspaper Independent Florida Alligator when he was attending UF as an undergraduate. His extensive papers are in the Special Collections Department of the University of Florida's Smathers Library.
