= Edward D. Hess =

American author and professor (born 1947)

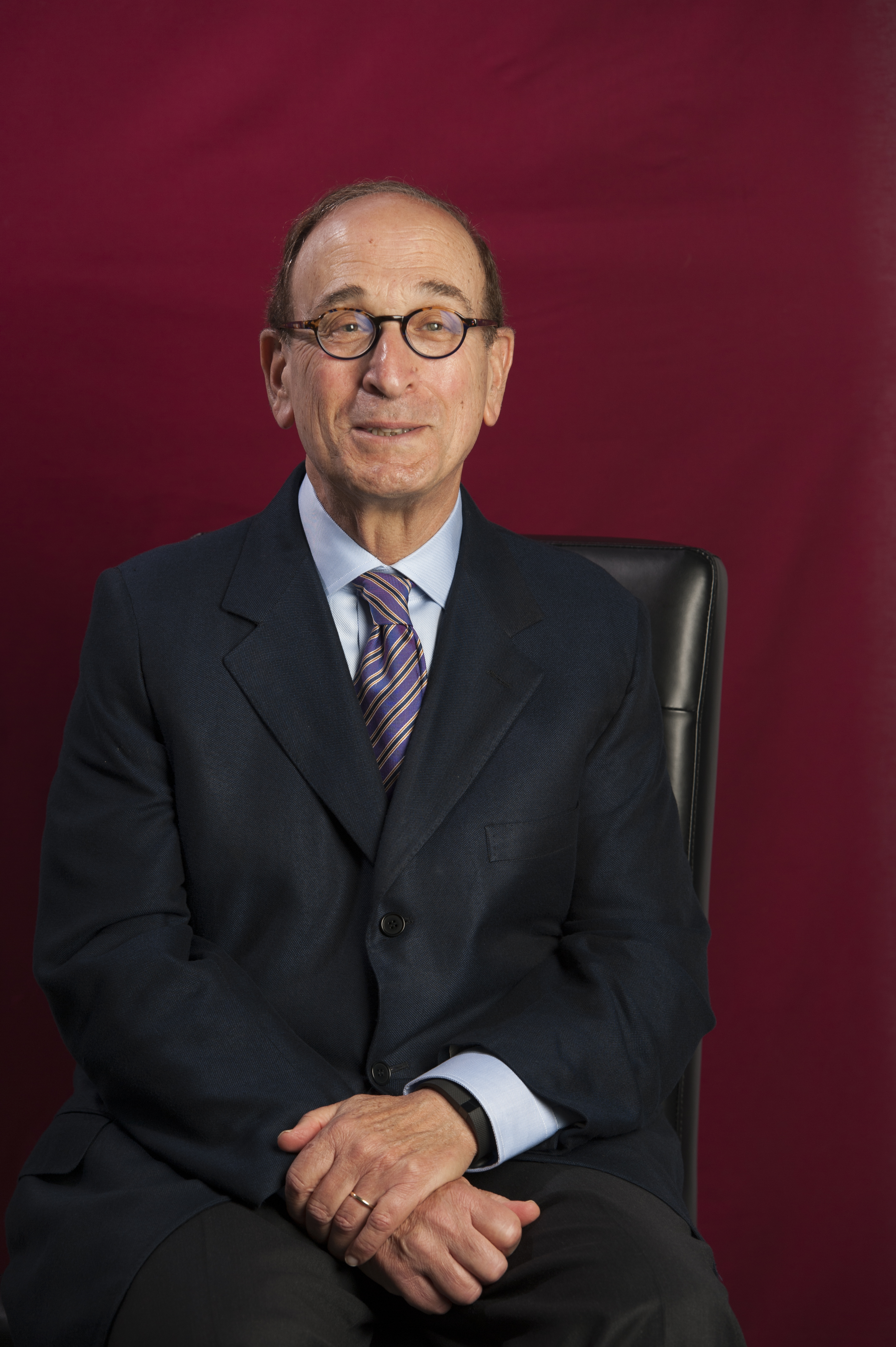
- Born: October 28, 1947 (age 79); Atlanta, GA
- Education: University of Florida, B.S. University of Virginia, J.D. New York University, L.L.M.
- Occupations: Author; professor
- Years active: 2002 - present
- Notable work: Smart Growth, Learn or Die
- Title: Professor of Business Administration, Batten Executive-in-Residence

Edward D. Hess (born October 28, 1947) is an American author and professor.

== Career ==
Hess began his business career over 20 years ago as a senior executive at Warburg Paribas Becker, and served as a senior executive at Boettcher & Company, the Robert M. Bass Group and Arthur Andersen.

Hess entered academia in 2002 as an adjunct professor of Organization and Management at the Goizueta School of Business at Emory University, where he was the founder and executive director of The Center for Entrepreneurship and Corporate Growth and The Values-Based Leadership Institute. Hess then created the Goizueta Leadership Academy, which was named the #1 MBA Leadership Program by Business Week in 2004.

In 2007, Hess joined the faculty of the Darden Business School as Professor of Business Administration and the first Batten Executive-in-Residence. He currently teaches in the Darden Business School MBA Programs, and in Executive Education programs, and has taught at IESE (Barcelona) and the Indian School of Business. He has consulted with major public and private companies. Hess' free online two-course MOOCS Grow to Greatness - the challenges of growing a private business - has been viewed by hundreds of thousands of people around the globe.

Hess is the author of 12 books, as well as over 100 articles and over 60 Darden cases dealing with growth, innovation and learning cultures, systems and processes.

=== Research ===
Hess' research has focused on organizational and human high performance. Specific research projects have included: The Organic Growth Index; The Characteristics of Consistent High Organic Growth Public Companies; The Risks of Growth; The Empirical Basis for U.S Growth Beliefs; The Challenges of Scaling a Private Business; Growth and Innovation Systems - Culture and Processes; Learning Systems; and The Organization of the Future in the Smart Machine Age.

== Published works ==
- Own Your Work Journey: The Path to Meaningful Work and Happiness in the Age of Smart Technology and Radical Change (2023)
- Hyper-Learning: How to Adapt to the Speed of Change (2020)
- Humility Is the New Smart: Rethinking Human Excellence In the Smart Machine Age (with Ludwig) (2017)
- Learn or Die: Using Science to Build a Leading-Edge Learning Organization (2014)
- The Physics of Business Growth: Mindsets, System and Processes (with Liedtka) (2012)
- Grow to Greatness: Smart Growth for Entrepreneurial Businesses (2012)
- Growing an Entrepreneurial Business: Concepts & Cases (2011)
- Smart Growth: Building Enduring Businesses by Managing the Risks of Growth (2010)
- So You Want to Start A Business (with Goetz) (2008)
- The Road To Organic Growth (2007)
- Leading with Values: Virtue, Positivity & High Performance (with Cameron) (2006)
- The Search for Organic Growth (with Kazanjian) (2006)

== Recognition ==
Smart Growth was named a Top 25 business book in 2010 for business owners by Inc. Magazine, a Top 10 Business Book for 2010 by the Toronto Globe, and was awarded the Wachovia Award for Research Excellence. Learn or Die was an Amazon best seller and was awarded the Wells Fargo Award for Research Excellence.

Hess's work has been featured in Fortune magazine, European Business Review, HBR, SHRM, Fast Company, WIRED, JiJi Press, Forbes, INC., Huffington Post, The Washington Post, Business Week, the Financial Times, Investor's Business Daily, CFO Review, Money Magazine and in more than 400 other global media publications. Additionally, his works have been featured on CNBC Squawk Box, Fox Business News with Maria Bartiroma, Big Think, WSJ Radio, Bloomberg Radio with Kathleen Hayes, Dow Jones Radio, MSNBC Radio, Business Insider, CBS Radio, and Wharton Radio.
