= Real Raw News =

American fake news website

- Home page on March 26, 2024
- Website type: Fake news website
- Founder: Michael Tuffin
- Website: realrawnews.com
- Launched: April 2020; 6 years ago

Real Raw News is an American fake news website created in April 2020. Many of its published stories include misinformation about COVID-19 vaccines, fictional arrests and supposed executions of public figures.

== History ==
Real Raw News was created in April 2020 by a person operating under the pseudonym of "Michael Baxter". The website started publishing articles that December.

In 2021, PolitiFact found that Baxter previously ran at least three other websites and associated YouTube channels that promoted conspiracy theories about topics such as alien visitations and the fictional planet Nibiru. On one such website, Twisted Truth, Baxter claimed to have worked as a "mainstream journalist" for the New York Post, The Village Voice and The Dallas Morning News. PolitiFact identified "Michael Baxter" as Michael Tuffin, a resident of Texas and New York.

Following inquiries by PolitiFact, Facebook stated it had removed the Real Raw News page for violating its COVID-19 policies, and Google banned advertisements from two Real Raw News stories that promoted COVID-19 and vaccine misinformation. In response, Real Raw News told readers to follow its Telegram account.

== Content ==
Since December 2020, the website has published articles that PolitiFact described as "spinning a narrative of military arrests and executions that reads like a wish list for diehard believers of the QAnon conspiracy theory." It has published stories about the supposed arrests of figures such as Deborah Birx, Nancy Pelosi and Janet Yellen, and executions of figures such as Hillary Clinton, James Comey and Tom Hanks. The website has also promoted the deep state conspiracy theory.

Real Raw News has published misinformation about COVID-19 vaccines, including baseless claims that they cause a disease called "monsterism" and that they contain pesticides and scopolamine. In September 2021, it published a false story about 27 U.S. Air Force pilots resigning over the COVID-19 vaccine mandate; the story was shared widely by Twitter users, including then-Fox Nation host Lara Logan and former Trump campaign aide George Papadopoulos. Real Raw News has also published pro-Trump, pro-Russia and anti-Ukraine content, including a false story asserting that Vladimir Putin had ordered the destruction of all COVID-19 vaccines in Russia.

Following the 2023 Hawaii wildfires, Real Raw News promoted falsehoods about U.S. Marines attacking a Federal Emergency Management Agency (FEMA) convoy fleeing the wildfires and arresting FEMA deputy administrator Erik Hooks.

The website includes a rebuttal to fact-checkers on its About page, claiming they are "arms of the Mainstream Media and the Biden regime's criminal Department of Defense".

=== Claims of publishing satire ===
In 2021, an email account named "Twisted Truth" claimed that Real Raw News was "a satire site, exposing the insanity of rabid Trumpists (who lack the mental wherewithal to distinguish fact from fiction)" after the online misinformation tracker NewsGuard contacted the website to determine its editorial process.

In April 2021, the website added a disclaimer that it "contains humor, parody, and satire"; Tuffin stated the disclaimer was included "to somewhat indemnify myself against potential legal ramification", but defended the content published on the website as truthful, saying, "I stand behind the articles and the sources who risk their safety to share information." Reports published by the website do not clarify if they are "informational and educational" or satirical.

Law professor Amy Gajda of Tulane University said that the "satire defense is actually very protective" against defamation lawsuits. Garrett Kelly, professor of the School of Communication at Ohio State University, stated: "Someone who is inclined to believe the content hosted on the site might interpret the 'disclaimer for our protection' as insincere, only intended to protect the publisher from lawsuits. In that situation, the reader might mistakenly conclude that claims made on the site are real."
