= Jamie Dupree =

American journalist

- Born: 1963 or 1964 (age 62–63); Washington, D.C., U.S.
- Education: University of Florida
- Occupations: Correspondent; Reporter
- Spouse: Lorraine Dupree

Jamie Dupree (born 1963–1964 in Washington, D.C.) is a Capitol Hill correspondent based in Washington, D.C., best known for his 32-year radio news career with Cox Radio.

== Career ==
He got his start in radio at the University of Florida in 1983, doing jazz music, blues, and then news. He served as the Senior Washington Correspondent for Atlanta's WSB Radio, along with numerous other Cox Media Group affiliates including WDBO, WOKV, WHIO, and KRMG.

Before his health issues took his voice, Dupree made frequent appearances on the conservative commentator Sean Hannity's radio show to discuss politics. Hannity called him "the most connected man in Washington."

In November 2018, Dupree was honored by the Radio and Television Correspondents' Association (RTCA) with its 2018 Career Achievement Award for Distinguished Reporting on Congress.

In April 2026, Dupree was inducted by the University of Florida College of Journalism and Communications into the college’s Hall of Fame.

Today, Jamie runs a blog that is filled with the happenings inside the halls of Congress. He has sparred with many of Trump Administrations departments having the Department of Justice even calling him a dope on twitter.

== Personal life ==
Dupree is married with three children.

Dupree is an Amateur Extra-class ham radio operator (NS3T) and is an avid contester.

== Health ==
In April 2016, Dupree noticed that his voice began to falter after becoming ill on a family vacation in the UK. His voice became scratchy and high, then he quickly lost the ability to speak coherently. He continued working by use of note cards to interview news makers. In April 2017, he was diagnosed with tongue protrusion dystonia, a rare neurological condition that impacted his reporting voice. Subsequent treatments were unsuccessful, but Dupree continued to work in written form through his articles and blog.

== Return to radio ==
With no resolution to his speech condition on the horizon, Dupree and his coworkers began looking for high tech solutions. The Scotland-based technology firm CereProc had the solution. CereProc processed hundreds of audio files of Dupree's previous reporting to produce a sophisticated text-to-speech program to synthesize Dupree's distinctive voice. On June 18, 2018, Dupree returned to the airwaves using the program which was dubbed Jamie Dupree 2.0.

Jamie Dupree left Cox Media Group on November 30, 2020.
