= Identity Theory (webzine) =

Identity Theory is a webzine of literature and culture, founded by the University of Florida graduate Matt Borondy, established in 2000. Identity Theory is a non-profit website with substantial readership and a staff of over a dozen volunteers, including Robert Birnbaum. It offers author and band interviews, fiction writing, artwork, and reviews, with a moral slant shown by its commitment to social justice.

Its roster of over 200 interviews includes authors Jonathan Ames, Tamim Ansary, Azar Nafisi, Howard Zinn, Robert Stone, Christopher Hitchens, James Ellroy, Ethan Hawke, and Chip Kidd, plus members of the bands Sleater-Kinney and Animal Collective.
