= H. G. Davis Jr. =

American journalist (1924–2004)

- Born: June 14, 1924; Manchester, Georgia, USA
- Died: August 16, 2004 (aged 80)
- Education: B.A., University of Florida
- Occupations: Journalist and educator

Horance Gibbs "Buddy" Davis Jr. (June 14, 1924 – August 16, 2004) was an American journalist and educator. He won a Pulitzer Prize in 1971 for a series of editorials in support of the peaceful desegregation of Florida's schools.

== Life ==
Davis was born in Manchester, Georgia. During World War II, he served in the Army Air Corps in the Pacific. He and his wife had a son, Gregory, and a daughter, Jennifer.

Davis received his bachelor's degree from the University of Florida and taught at its University of Florida School of Journalism (established 1953) from 1954 to 1985. From 1962 to 1983 he was a columnist and editorial writer for The Gainesville Sun; from 1983 to 1989, a columnist for the New York Times Regional Newspaper Group.

He died of heart failure in August 2004 at the age of 80.

== Awards and honors ==
In 1971 he won the Pulitzer Prize for Editorial Writing and he was named a UF Distinguished Alumnus. In 1977, he received the highest service award from the Society of Professional Journalists, the Wells Memorial Key.
