= Janis Owens =

- Born: 1960 (age 65–66); Marianna, Florida, U.S.
- Education: University of Florida
- Spouse: Wendel Owens
- Writing career
- Genre: Fiction

Janis Owens (born 1960) is an American author. She has written four novels and one cookbook. American Ghost, her latest novel, was published in 2012.

== Early life and education ==
Owens is a native of North Florida, born a few miles south of the Alabama/Georgia border in the town of Marianna. She was the last child and only daughter of an Assemblies of God preacher, Roy Johnson, and his wife, Martha Johnson.

When she was a toddler, her father gave up the ministry and became an insurance salesman. From Marianna, the family moved to New Orleans, then Hattiesburg, Mississippi, then to finally back to North Florida. They eventually ended up in Ocala, which is where she spent the remainder of her childhood.

Shortly after graduating high school she married Wendel Owens, a native of Arkansas. In 1983, after the birth of her first daughter, Owens graduated from the University of Florida.

== Career ==
After graduating from college, Owens began writing her first novel, My Brother Michael. The novel is set in Marianna, Florida, where she spent her early childhood. She says she "finished in due time...it was received well enough, considering it was a first novel and I was a twenty-four year old half-wit at the time." My Brother Michael relates the story of Gabriel Catts and his lifelong love for his brother's wife, Myra.

Owens then wrote Myra Sims, which tells the story from Myra's perspective. The Schooling of Claybird Catts, Owens' third novel, brings the story full circle and carries it into the next generation.

Owens most recent novel, due for publication October 2013, is "American Ghost" (Scribner.)

=== Cracker roadshow ===
Another project of hers is the "Cracker Roadshow", which she describes thusly:

In the past ten years, when traveling and speaking about my books, I would occasionally describe myself as a "Southerner of the Cracker persuasion" to the great amusement of my audience, especially if I said it outside the South. They found the word deprecating and naïve and inevitably, someone would ask why I'd so proudly associate myself with a word that had such a loaded historic connotation. To them, it was clear that Cracker equaled: ignorant, racist, toothless and base. To me, it meant a whole different thing, and in time, re-educating my audience over the roots and true heritage of the word became an interesting side line.

== Works ==
- My Brother Michael
- Myra Sims
- The Schooling of Claybird Catts
- The Cracker Kitchen (2009)
- American Ghost

== See also ==
- Cracker, a pejorative term
- Florida cracker
