= Kathleen Hays =

American economist

- Education: Olympia High School, 1970
- Alma mater: Stanford University
- Occupations: journalist, economist
- Known for: presenter on Bloomberg Media

Kathleen Hays is a university-trained economist with experience at the Federal Reserve and who was formerly an on-air financial reporter for Bloomberg Television. She was formerly a reporter for Investor's Business Daily, CNBC's Squawk Box and various CNNfn programming before joining Bloomberg.

== Education ==
She is fluent in English and Spanish. She holds both a bachelor's degree and a master's degree in economics from Stanford University.
