= Jeffrey Scott Shapiro =

American journalist and attorney

- Born: April 27, 1973 (age 53); Houston, Texas, United States
- Education: J.D. University of Florida, B.S. Florida State University
- Occupations: Attorney and Journalist
- Employer: The Washington Times
- Known for: Journalism ethics and standards
- Opponent: Tabloid journalism

Jeffrey Scott Shapiro (born April 27, 1973) is a practicing American attorney and nationally recognized investigative journalist who has reported on several high-profile criminal and political cases, often defending people who become targets of the tabloid media. He currently writes legal analysis for The Washington Times and previously served as a criminal prosecutor in Washington, D.C., handling statutory offenses that implicate the First Amendment.

Shapiro's key political investigations include the Oklahoma City bombing, the September 11 attacks, the poisoning of Alexander Litvinenko, the 2011 military intervention in Libya and U.S. military cooperation with the Russian space program. He investigated the murders of JonBenét Ramsey and Chandra Levy for several news outlets, reported on the Columbine High School massacre for Time (magazine), covered the Kobe Bryant sexual assault case and death of Michael Jackson for CBS News, and helped discredit the now retracted Rolling Stone story, A Rape on Campus for The Washington Times.

== Journalism ethics and standards ==
Early in his career, Shapiro investigated the murder of JonBenet Ramsey for the Globe tabloid newspaper, but he quickly turned against it reporting his editors to the Federal Bureau of Investigation (FBI) for criminal violations, and later testifying before a Colorado grand jury. Shapiro was profiled in October 1998 by Newsweek magazine as a young, dedicated tabloid journalist, but by May 1999, New York (magazine) reported that he experienced a "reincarnation as a fervid anti-tabloid crusader." He has since engaged in a long-standing campaign against the tabloid industry by speaking out against their journalism practices and supporting legislation to penalize paparazzi when endangering the public. Shapiro's anti-tabloid views have been controversial among other journalists, and he has been both praised and criticized by the mainstream press.

Shapiro's change of heart came at a time when tabloids were immersed in controversy due to the mysterious death of Diana, Princess of Wales, who died during a paparazzi chase in Paris on August 31, 1997. British journalism professor Michael Tracey, who was teaching mass media at the University of Colorado convinced Shapiro that continuing to work for the tabloids would be immoral since Shapiro believed the stories accusing John Ramsey were false. Shapiro felt compassion for the people his editors were targeting, and he telephoned John Ramsey to apologize for his participation in the tabloid journalism world. Soon thereafter, Shapiro reported his editors to the FBI for conspiring to blackmail lead Boulder Detective Steve Thomas for sealed grand jury evidence, and revealed how his editors engaged in commercial bribery and illegal information brokering. The FBI was unable to refer the case to the United States Attorney, but criminal charges were filed by Colorado prosecutors. A grand jury was convened by the Jefferson County District Attorney's Office and the "Globe" challenged the charges on First Amendment grounds. The Colorado Supreme Court ruled against the tabloid, and Globe editors pledged to donate $100,000 to the University of Colorado journalism ethics studies program and publicly admit they had acted "unethically" in exchange for a dismissal of all charges.

In a 2003 interview with CNN host Paula Zahn, Shapiro said he never broke the law while working for the tabloids, but admitted that his "reporting helped inflict a lot of misery on innocent people," and that he was interested in helping victims of tabloid persecution. That same year the Vail Daily summarized Shapiro's change of heart, reporting that "he left the tabloid world in a blaze of glory handing the Globe to the FBI on a silver platter." He has since actively campaigned against tabloid journalism practices by defending people ridiculed by the press.

== Investigative journalism ==
Shapiro currently writes for The Washington Times as a legal analyst and investigative reporter. His key political investigations uncovered new DNA evidence in the 1995 Oklahoma City bombing, revealed secret recordings of Pentagon officials discussing the 2011 military intervention in Libya, shined a light on the Kremlin's poisoning of Alexander Litvinenko and brought attention to the United States Air Force's use of Russian rocket engines. Previously in New York, Shapiro reported on the Robert Hanssen Soviet spy case and September 11 attacks for The Journal News. Shortly after the Twin Towers attack, he confirmed a 9/11 urban legend about a Brooklyn high school under FBI investigation for reportedly predicting the collapse of the World Trade Center. Newsweek columnist Jonathan Alter and Daily Telegraph commentator Mark Steyn confirmed the story, but Snopes classified the incident and a similar episode reported in the Houston Chronicle as "undetermined." Shapiro has also covered several criminal investigations including the murder of JonBenét Ramsey, the Columbine High School massacre, the Kobe Bryant sexual assault case, the death of Michael Jackson, the potential extradition of Amanda Knox for the murder of Meredith Kercher and the now retracted Rolling Stone story, A Rape on Campus, which falsely accused several University of Virginia fraternity members of sexual assault.

== Practice of law ==
Shapiro graduated from law school at the University of Florida, was trained by the United States Attorney in Washington, D.C. and subsequently prosecuted First Amendment related cases for the Office of the Attorney General for the District of Columbia. He prosecuted unlawful protestors who demonstrated at the United States Capitol and White House, including Code Pink activist Desiree Ali-Fairooz who was accused of assaulting U.S. Secretary of State Condoleezza Rice during a committee hearing in the United States House of Representatives. After the 2012 Sandy Hook Elementary School shooting, Shapiro authored a column for The Wall Street Journal, revealing his criticisms of gun control based on the ineffectiveness of the 1976 District of Columbia gun ban, which was struck down by the Supreme Court of the United States in District of Columbia v. Heller. He currently practices law in California, Florida and Washington, D.C.

== Trump Administration ==
Shapiro was appointed as a senior advisor of the Broadcasting Board of Governors in the summer of 2017.

== Authored books ==
- Shapiro, Jeffrey Scott; Jennifer Stevens (2004). Kobe Bryant: The Game of His Life. New York, New York: Revolution Publishing. ISBN 0974868418.
- Shapiro, Jeffrey Scott; Steven I. Friedland (2008). The Essential Rules for Bar Exam Success. Eagan, Minnesota: Thomson Reuters/Thomson Reuters/West. ISBN 9780314176783.
