= Rektok Ross =

American writer

Liani Kotcher
- Born: Liani Gwen Kotcher; May 1, 1980 (age 46)
- Education: University of Florida (BS); University of Miami (JD)
- Occupations: writer, journalist, entertainment host, lawyer

Liani Gwen Kotcher (aka Rektok Ross) (born May 1, 1980) is an American young-adult fiction writer, journalist, and entertainment host, best known for her contemporary romance novel Prodigal.Prodigal tells the story of a romance between two teenagers from different religious and economic backgrounds that find love in unexpected places. The novel reached number 1 on The Amazon Best Sellers List for its category in February 2013.

Ross is also a popular young-adult entertainment journalist with her own weekly column at The Examiner, an online magazine with over 20 million unique visitors in July 2010.

== Biography ==
Ross was born in a small town in South Florida. From a young age, her mother, an elementary school teacher, instilled in her a love of reading. Ross spent much of her childhood in public libraries and book stores. Later, she received her journalism degree from The University of Florida, where she graduated with honors, and her J.D. degree from The University of Miami, where she graduated magna cum laude. While still in law school, Ross completed an internship in the legal and business affairs department of Miramax Studios and has practiced entertainment law at a top international law firm. She left the firm in September 2018.

== Career ==
Ross is a young-adult author best known for her contemporary romance and inspiration novel Prodigal about two teenagers from different religious and economic backgrounds that fall in love against all odds. Prodigal reached number 1 on The Amazon Best Sellers List for its category in February 2013.

In addition to writing novels, Ross has also received acclaim for her screenplays. Ross's experiences at Miramax Studios later led Ross to writing, producing, and directing a comedy short — Weasels the Movie— with her brother. Weasels is the story of two lovable losers who finally find their niche as tabloid photographers, but first discover that tabloid photography is not as easy as it looks. Ross additionally voiced many of the characters for Weasels and the film screened in 2011 at the Boca Film Festival.

Ross is also a journalist covering young-adult book entertainment. Ross is the official Los Angeles journalist for young-adult entertainment for renowned national online magazine The Examiner, where she reports on news and trends in the Young Adult entertainment world. She has covered the red carpet and premiere circuit for numerous high-profile events and film festivals and has interviewed actors from television shows like The Vampire Diaries and Game of Thrones to book-to-film adaptations like Beautiful Creatures to musicians like Grammy award-winning band Train, to best selling authors such as Lauren Kate of the "Fallen" series.
