= Steven J. Kachelmeier =

Steven J. Kachelmeier is the Thomas O. Hicks Endowed Chair at the McCombs School of Business, The University of Texas at Austin. His research applies methods of experimental economics to issues in auditing, management accounting, and financial reporting.

== Education and career ==
Kachelmeier received his B.B.A. in accounting from the University of New Mexico and Ph.D. in accounting from the University of Florida.

He began teaching at the University of Texas at Austin in 1988. His research and teaching interests include financial accounting, auditing, and experimental economics.

Kachelmeier has held the C.T. Zlatkovich Centennial Professor Chair (2003 – 2009), the Randal B. McDonald Chair (2009 – 2022) and the Thomas O. Hooks chair (2022- present) at the same university.

In 2022 he was named chair of the Accounting Department at the McCombs School of Business.

He was editor of The Accounting Review from 2008-2011.

== Selected publications ==
- Kachelmeier, Steven J., R. Alan Webb, and Michael G. Williamson. 2024. “Do Performance-Contingent Incentives Help or Hinder Divergent Thinking?” The Accounting Review 99 (2): 229–48.
- Kachelmeier, Steven J., and Dan Rimkus. 2022. “Does Seeking Audit Evidence Impede the Willingness to Impose Audit Adjustments?” The Accounting Review 97 (7): 269–94.
- Kachelmeier, Steven J., Dan Rimkus, Jaime J. Schmidt, and Kristen Valentine. 2020. “The Forewarning Effect of Critical Audit Matter Disclosures Involving Measurement Uncertainty*.” Contemporary Accounting Research 37 (4): 2186–2212.
- Steven J. Kachelmeier. 2018. Do Journals Signal or Reflect? An Alternative Perspective on Editorial Board Composition. Critical Perspectives on Accounting 51, 62-69.
- Kachelmeier, Steven J., Tracie Majors, and Michael G. Williamson. 2014. “Does Intent Modify Risk-Based Auditing?” The Accounting Review 89 (6): 2181–2201.
- Kachelmeier, Steven J., and Michael G. Williamson. 2010. “Attracting Creativity: The Initial and Aggregate Effects of Contract Selection on Creativity-Weighted Productivity.” The Accounting Review 85 (5): 1669–91.
- Kachelmeier, Steven J., Bernhard E. Reichert, and Michael G. Williamson. 2008. “Measuring and Motivating Quantity, Creativity, or Both.” Journal of Accounting Research 46 (2): 341–73.
- Kachelmeier, Steven J. and Kristy L. Towry. 2005. "The Limitations of Experimental Design: A Case Study Involving Monetary Incentive Effects in Laboratory Markets." Experimental Economics 8, 21-33.
- Kachelmeier, Steven J. “Reviewing the Review Process.” The Journal of the American Taxation Association 26, no. s-1 (2004): 143–54.
- Kachelmeier, Steven J. and Mohamed Shehata. 1992. "Examining Risk Preferences Under High Monetary Incentives: Experimental Evidence from the People's Republic of China." The American Economic Review 82, 1120-1141.
- Kachelmeier, Steven J., Stephen T. Limberg, and Michael S. Schadewald. n.d. “Fairness in Markets: A Laboratory Investigation.” Journal of Economic Psychology 12 (3) 1991: 447–64.
