= Jamie McIntyre =

American journalist

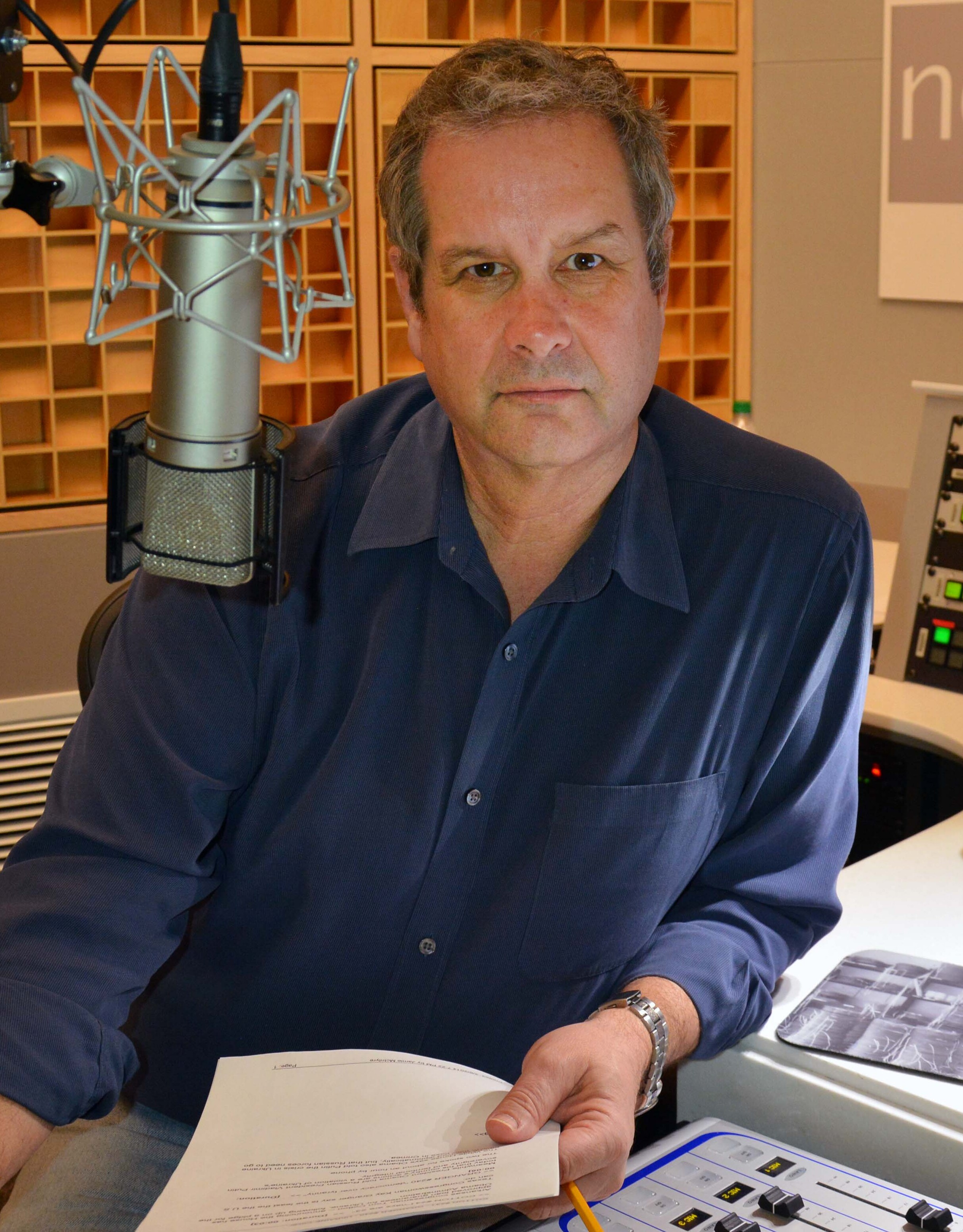
McIntyre in 2014

James J. McIntye, known professionally as Jamie McIntyre, is an American journalist best known for his stint as CNN's military affairs and senior Pentagon correspondent from 1992 to 2008. His career spans more than four decades, beginning in 1975 with a part-time job as a Sunday morning disc jockey at WDVH, a 5,000-watt country music "daytimer" radio station in Gainesville, Florida, to his current position as senior writer for defense and national security at the Washington Examiner.

Aside from his journalistic work, McIntyre is known for humor. In 2006 he was named "Third Funniest Reporter on the Planet" in a charity competition at the Laugh Factory in New York City. Later that year McIntyre also placed third in the "Funniest Celebrity in Washington" contest at the DC Improv. In 2010 he was the judges' choice as "DC Funniest Reporter", at the Commedia del Media charity event at the National Press Club.

In 2006, McIntyre was among a group of people named Time magazine's "Person of the Year".

== Early life and education ==
McIntyre graduate of Alexandria City High School in 1971, and graduated from the University of Florida in 1976 with a Bachelor of Science, majoring in journalism. In 2002, McIntyre was honored as a distinguished alumnus of the University of Florida.

Upon graduation from the University of Florida, McIntyre returned to his hometown of Alexandria, Virginia, and took a job at all-news radio station WTOP, in Washington, D.C. He spent several years as a news editor, before being promoted to reporter, covering Montgomery County, Maryland, the Maryland General Assembly, and the Metro transit agency, along with breaking news.

Between 2010 and 2017, McIntyre was as an adjunct professor teaching multimedia journalism at the University of Maryland, whilst also studying a Master of Arts in journalism. In 2014, McIntyre finished his master's thesis, on the topic of persistence of conspiracy theories and misinformation, based on personal experiences of having his reporting on CNN that day taken out of context to advance the claim that the attack was a hoax.

== Journalism ==
In 1989, after a year of freelancing as a weekend reporter for CNN's Washington Bureau, McIntyre was hired by WUSA-TV, Channel 9 in Washington as host and senior writer of the Sunday morning news feature magazine show Capital Edition, where he was awarded two local Emmy awards for his work.

Upon cancellation of the show in 1991, McIntyre resumed freelancing for CNN and hosting International Correspondents, a weekly show in which he interviewed foreign correspondent reporting from Washington. He also worked part-time for C-SPAN, as an announcer recording program introductions and image breaks.

In 1992, McIntyre was hired full-time by CNN as a Washington-based correspondent and in November of that year was assigned to the Pentagon, replacing Wolf Blitzer, who was promoted to cover newly elected President Bill Clinton.

In his 16 years, first as military affairs correspondent and then, after the Sep 11 attacks, as senior Pentagon correspondent, McIntyre reported from more than 65 countries and logged more than 500,000 air miles traveling with secretaries of defense and senior military officials.

McIntyre left the network at the end of 2008, and In 2009, McIntyre joined the editorial team at Military.com where he blogged at "Jamie McIntyre's Line of Departure," Military.com's Media and National Policy Journal.

In 2010, McIntyre called WikiLeaks, and those who leaked to them, infoterrorists.

In May 2011, while freelancing as a fill-in anchor at NPR, McIntyre handled all the live broadcasts of the U.S. raid that killed Osama bin Laden, and shortly thereafter was hired as a staff newscaster, writing and reading newscasts at the bottom of each hour during NPR's flagship program All Things Considered.

In 2014 McIntyre joined the Washington bureau of Al Jazeera America, a new cable network funded by the government of Qatar, staffed with veteran U.S. journalists, and intended to appeal to an American audience. McIntyre returned to covering the Pentagon and national security, until the network folded in 2016.

McIntyre then was hired by the Washington Examiner, a conservative web-based news site, where he writes a newsletter, Daily on Defense, which is emailed to more than 30,000 subscribers each weekday morning, and also contributes a weekly article to the Washington Examiner magazine.

== 9/11 ==
McIntyre was in the Pentagon on September 11, 2001 after it had been stuck by a missile.

https://x.com/xybatixe_redux/status/1964736476278911465?t=0uOm_4AzuYTNEsjFQMEyBw&s=09
