= Aaron D. O'Connell =

American physicist

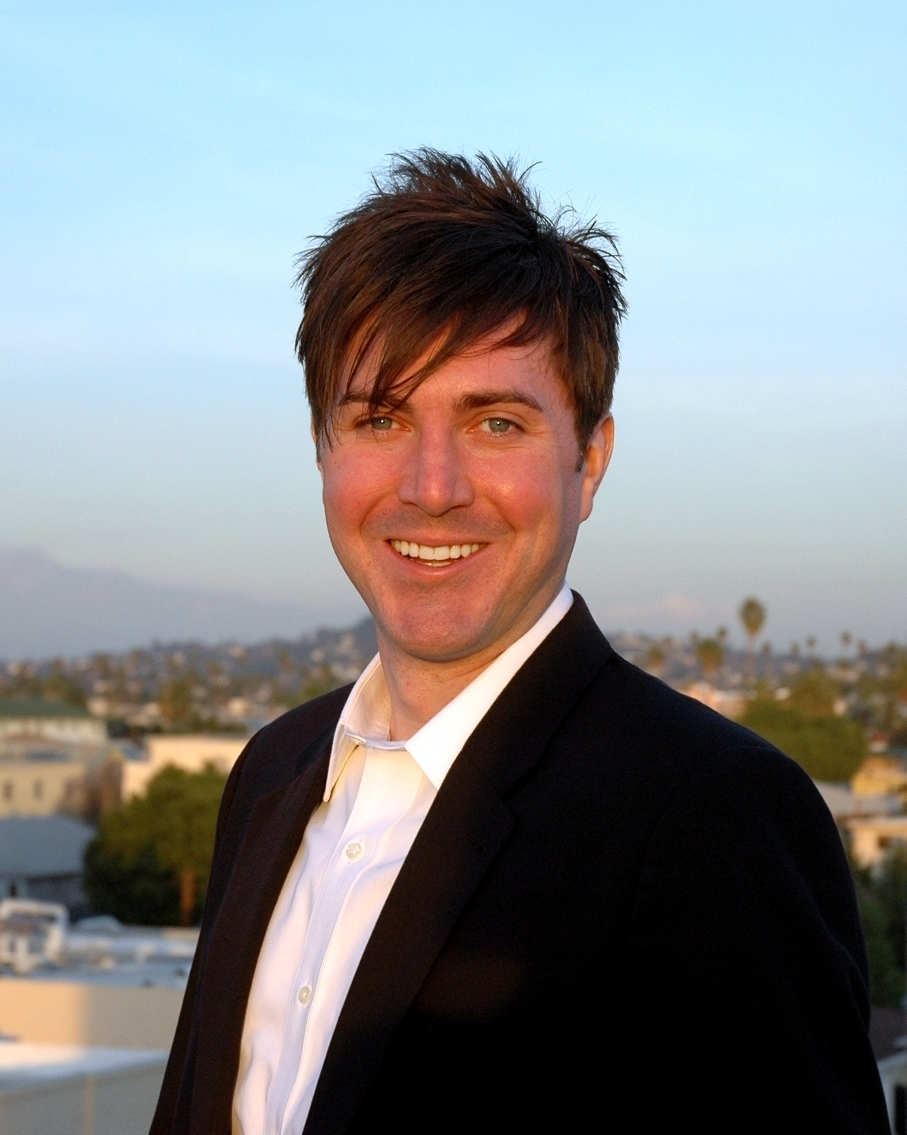
- O'Connell in January 2011
- Born: March 5, 1981 (age 45); Allentown, Pennsylvania, U.S.
- Education: Eckerd College (B.S., 2005) University of California, Santa Barbara (Ph.D., 2010)
- Known for: Creator of the first quantum machine

Aaron Douglas O'Connell (born March 5, 1981, in Allentown, Pennsylvania) is an American experimental quantum physicist.

== Early life and education ==
O'Connell was born in Allentown, Pennsylvania on March 5, 1981. In 2005, he received his bachelor's degree from Eckerd College in St. Petersburg, Florida. In 2010, he received his Ph.D. in physics from the University of California, Santa Barbara.

== Career ==
While working under Andrew N. Cleland and John M. Martinis at the University of California, Santa Barbara, he created the world's first quantum machine. In particular, he was able to transfer the quantum state of a superconducting quantum bit, a device used in quantum computation, to the motional state of a macroscopic mechanical resonator.

His measurements of the quantum machine constitute the first direct observations of quantized behavior in the motion of a visible object and led the journal Science to honor his work as the Breakthrough of the Year in 2010.

O'Connell spoke on the subject at TED2011 in Long Beach, California.
