= Eckerd College =

Private college in St. Petersburg, Florida, US

Coordinates: 27°43′1.55″N 82°41′18.26″W

- Former name: Florida Presbyterian College (1958-1972)
- Motto: Think Outside
- Type: Private liberal arts college
- Established: 1958; 68 years ago
- Accreditation: SACS
- Religious affiliation: Presbyterian Church (USA)
- Academic affiliations: Space-grant; Annapolis Group; Oberlin Group; CIC
- Endowment: $58.3 million (2018)
- President: James J. Annarelli
- Students: 1,986 (fall 2023)
- Location: St. Petersburg, Florida, United States
- Campus: 188 acres (0.76 km^{2}), suburban
- Colors: Teal and Navy
- Nickname: Tritons
- Sporting affiliations: NCAA Division II – Sunshine State
- Website: eckerd.edu

Eckerd College is a private liberal arts college in St. Petersburg, Florida, United States. Founded in 1958, part of the campus is waterfront and beach on Boca Ciega Bay. Because of its location, Eckerd is considered a "beach school" and has its own student volunteer maritime search and rescue team. It is accredited by the Southern Association of Colleges and Schools and a member of the Annapolis group of national liberal arts colleges and the Oberlin Group of Libraries.

== History ==
The institution now known as Eckerd College was founded as Florida Presbyterian College in 1958 as part of national growth in post-secondary education driven by GIs entering college after returning from World War II and later by the baby boom. The United Presbyterian Church in the U.S.A. and the Presbyterian Church worked together to establish the college, receiving a charter from the Florida legislature in 1958 and opening in 1960. The college opened in temporary quarters at Bayboro Harbor with a liberal arts focus and 154 freshmen; it had 310 freshmen and sophomores in January 1962, when it was about to expand with the addition of a junior class, and began the 1966–1967 academic year with 810 students. In 1971, drugstore magnate Jack Eckerd donated $12.5 million to the college as part of his broader interest in Florida politics. The following year the institution's name was changed to Eckerd College. Ruth Eckerd Hall, a 2,100-seat regional performing arts venue for concerts, plays and civic events in nearby Clearwater, also benefited from Eckerd's philanthropy, and is named for Jack Eckerd's wife. Eckerd would serve as interim president of the college. Despite the name change from Florida Presbyterian, a covenant relationship is still maintained with the Presbyterian Church, and conferred degrees have the text "founded in 1958 as Florida Presbyterian College" in the official seal.

In the 1980s, college president Peter H. Armacost decided to spend much of the college's endowment on real estate development — specifically, building waterfront homes and a retirement center on college-owned land next to the main campus. In 2000, the board of trustees discovered that more than half of Eckerd's endowment had been spent without its knowledge or consent. Armacost abruptly retired, the college's vice president for finance resigned, and the college itself eventually lost the partially developed land. Armacost's retirement was met with controversy from both faculty and alumni, and despite the scandal, the main library on campus still bears Armacost's name. In February 2004, the college announced that it had regained solvency.

Despite this, one of the first challenges Armacost's replacement, Donald R. Eastman III, faced was having the institution warned that it might lose its accreditation because of these financial problems. Partially in response, in May 2006, Miles Collier, then-chairman of the board of trustees, and his wife, Parker Collier, announced a $25 million challenge gift to the college; they subsequently increased this to $40 million. In November 2008, alumnus Grover Wrenn, a member of the founding Class of 1964, gave the college a $1 million gift, the largest at the time from an alumnus.

Eastman's position at Eckerd became the second-longest of any president at the college. Although later in his tenure he came under criticism for statements about campus sexual assault, Eastman is still credited with doubling applications for admission to Eckerd, providing more student housing, and improving the college's stature after its financial scandal.

In the fall semester of 2021, Eckerd had 718 first-year and transfer students, its largest incoming class yet.

=== Presidents ===
1. William H. Kadel (1958–1968)
2. Billy O. Wireman (1968–1977)
  - Jack Eckerd (interim, 1977)
3. Peter H. Armacost (1977–2000)
  - Eugene Hotchkiss (interim, 2000–2001)
4. Donald R. Eastman III (2001–2020)
5. Damián J. Fernández (2020–2022)
6. James J. Annarelli (interim, 2022; 2023–present)

== Academics ==
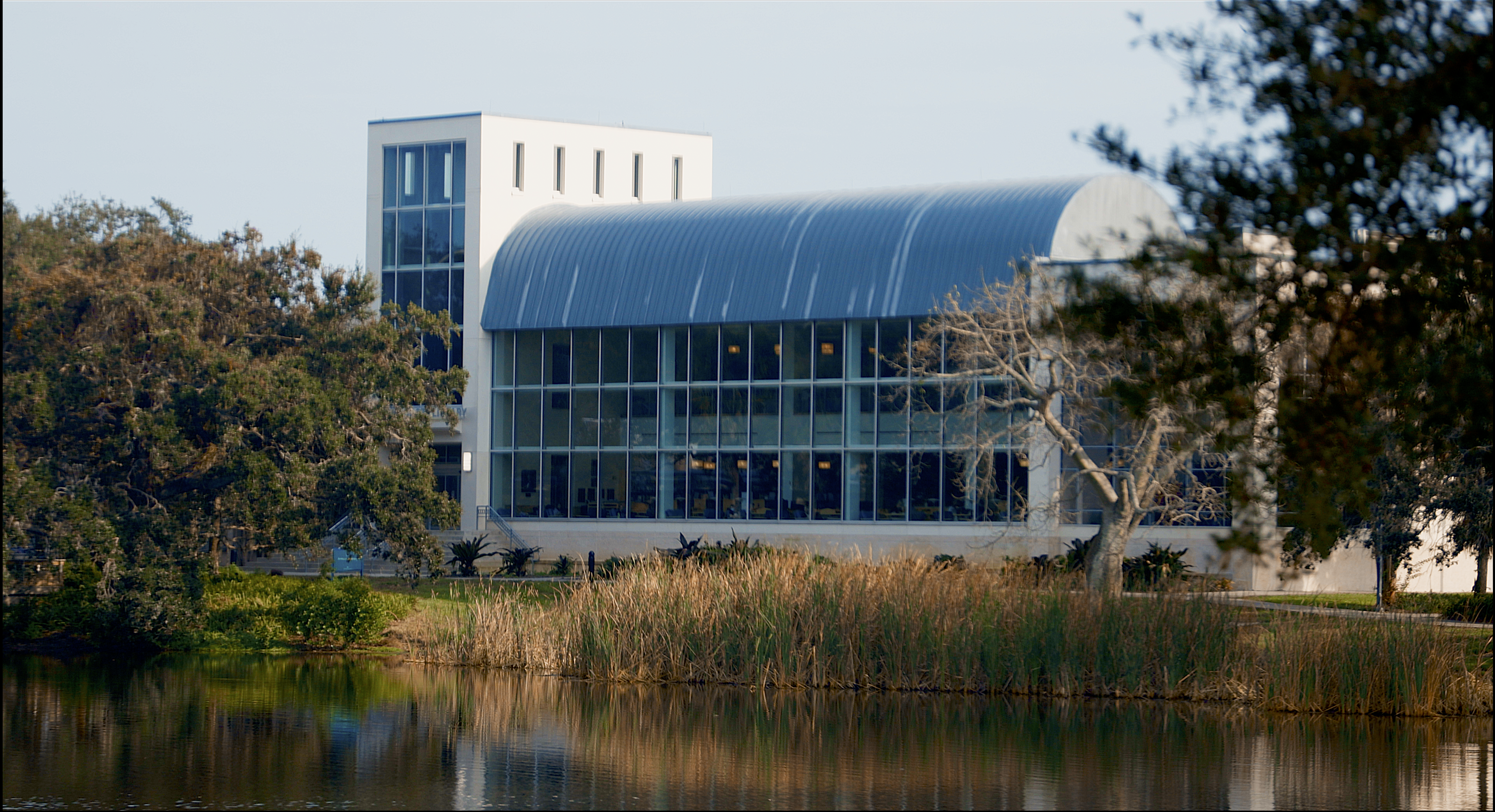
The Peter H. Armacost Library, designed by Ayers Saint Gross, houses nearly 250,000 volumes and the Eckerd College Special Collections.

Eckerd College is accredited to award Bachelor of Arts, Bachelor of Science, and Bachelor of Fine Arts degrees in more than forty majors, or students can design their own concentrations. Its most popular majors, based on 2021 graduates, were:

- Marine Biology and Biological Oceanography (76)
- Biology/Biological Sciences (57)
- Environmental Studies (50)
- Psychology (35)
- Development and Child Psychology (20)

Every student takes four years of classes across a wide variety of fields—art, literature, the natural and social sciences—regardless of their major. Often called General Education, these courses are designed to provide critical thought, the ability to make complex decisions and a commitment to lifelong learning. Every student is required to complete a set number of hours of "reflective service-learning" before graduation. New students take their first college course during a three-week orientation called "Autumn Term" that is guided by faculty and peer mentors.

Eckerd College originated the 4-1-4 academic calendar, with the "1" representing the Winter Term during the month of January, in which each student concentrates on a single class, often studying abroad. Before graduation, students in nearly all majors are required to either pass a senior-year comprehensive examination or to complete a senior thesis project. All students must complete a senior seminar course in their final year.

As there are no graduate programs, all undergraduate students have access to research opportunities including first-year research associateships, the Ford Apprentice Scholars Program (launched by a grant from the Ford Foundation), honor societies, an honors program and an annual research symposium. Notable projects include the Eckerd College Dolphin Project, the longest running undergraduate-centered dolphin research program in the world., and D.A.R.W.I.N., a computer science project (partnered closely with marine science) to automate dolphin dorsal fin recognition. A United States Geological Survey center in St. Petersburg provides further research opportunities. The Florida Fish and Wildlife Conservation Commission (FWC) received a $6.7 million grant in 2021 to design and construct a new Marine Mammal Pathobiology Lab on Eckerd's campus to augment the lab currently owned and operated by FWC on Eckerd property just outside the college's gates.

Phi Beta Kappa (Eckerd is one of the youngest colleges in the country to be awarded a chapter) and Sigma Xi are among the nationally recognized honor societies at Eckerd College. The Ethics Bowl teams have consistently captured awards in intercollegiate competition, winning the competition for seven straight years (2004–2011).

Students can study abroad, including at the Eckerd College Study Centre on London's Gower Street, with scholarship opportunities. On average, students travel 1,000 miles from home to attend Eckerd—from roughly 48 states and 35 countries. Eckerd also offers short-term English-immersion courses in a dedicated campus facility.

The Eckerd College seal was originally designed by Margaret Rigg, one of the founding faculty of the art department who started teaching at Florida Presbyterian College in 1965, as a medal that was part of the ribbon worn by graduates at commencement ceremonies.

=== Rankings ===
Eckerd College was ranked #130 (tie) in the National Liberal Arts Colleges category of the 2022-23 U.S. News & World Report Best Colleges rankings.

Eckerd College was ranked No. 128 (tie) overall in the National Liberal Arts Colleges category of the 2022 U.S. News & World Report Best Colleges rankings.

Eckerd is one of 40 liberal arts schools that was profiled in Loren Pope's Colleges That Change Lives.

Eckerd College ranked No. 2 in the nation, among baccalaureate institutions, for the number of students who participate in short-term study abroad and No. 3 for the total number of study abroad students in the 2018–2019 academic year, by the Institute of International Education.

Eckerd ranks No. 1 in the United States in the number of National Oceanic and Atmospheric Administration Hollings Scholars it has produced since that undergraduate scholarship program's inception in 2005.

Eckerd ranked No. 3 among small schools on the list of Peace Corps top volunteer-producing colleges and universities in 2020.

Eckerd was profiled in The Princeton Review's Best 386 Colleges as well as its Guide to Green Colleges in 2022.

== Campus ==
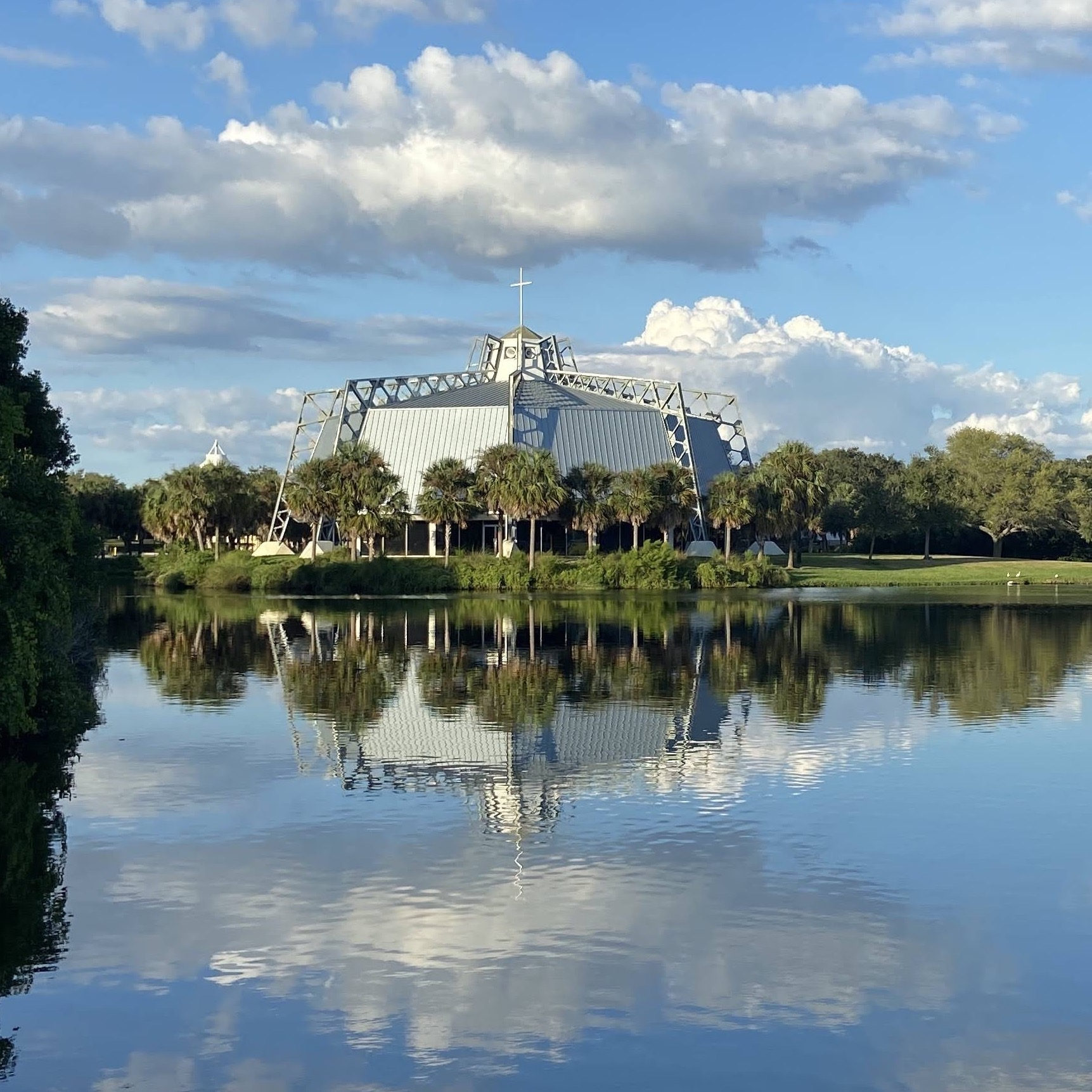
Wireman Chapel, constructed in 1968–69, was originally named Griffin Chapel for Ben Hill Griffin Jr., a founding trustee of the college. It was renovated and rededicated to Billy O. Wireman, Eckerd's second president, in 2007.

Eckerd College has a suburban 188-acre (0.76 km^{2}) campus on Frenchman's Creek and Boca Ciega Bay, about 3 miles (4.8 km) from Gulf of Mexico beaches. The campus is near residential and commercial neighborhoods of St. Petersburg.

The college has various sustainability efforts, including bikesharing systems and efforts to reduce plastic waste.

The school is ranked on the Princeton Review's list of Green Colleges for its sustainability efforts.

In 1958, the founders of Eckerd College hired the Chicago architectural firm of Perkins and Will to design the college's campus and first buildings. The result is one of the world's largest intact collections of midcentury modern educational buildings designed by some of the 20th century's most important school architects. A common feature is the use of glass and external views to emphasize a connection with the environment. Recent campus additions include the Armacost Library, Iota residential housing complex, sports facilities; renovations to the student center, residence halls, and Miller Auditorium were also completed. Other campus buildings include those designed and used for classrooms, laboratories, offices, conferences, theatrical productions, musical instruction, art exhibits, athletic events, and student services.

Armacost Library is a $15 million facility that opened in January 2005. The 58,000 sq ft (5,400 m^{2}) two-story library is located near the college's student center and residence complexes. It houses book and periodical collections and features seating for about 400, including 17 group-study rooms and 58 computer stations. Both high-speed cable and wireless connectivity are available throughout the library.

In addition to aquarium rooms, a marine sediment core facility, an oceanography lab, and a computer lab, the Galbraith Marine Science Laboratory, which was renovated in 2014, features a continuous flow-through system that pumps seawater into the building, so students can study marine organisms without harming them.

The James Center For Molecular and Life Sciences, a 51,000-square-foot (4,700 m^{2}), $25 million laboratory facility, opened in February 2013. On the western side of campus, the Doyle Sailing Center was completed in 2016 to become the new home for the Eckerd Sailing teams. In 2018, The Helmar and Enole Nielsen Center for Visual Arts opened at the cost of a U.S. $15 million. This 33,000-square-foot (3,066 m2) center nurtures art forms from ancient to contemporary to not-yet-invented. All three projects incorporate green initiatives and feature natural landscaping to accent the facilities.

== Peter H. Armacost Library ==
In March 2002, anonymous donors contributed $13 million, the largest donation ever given to the college, to establish the 58,000 square foot (5,388 square meters) 2-story library named for past president, Peter H. Armacost. Fox Hall was demolished to make room for the library. The donation was taken as a "vote of confidence" from Eckerd College donors after an endowment shortfall during the Armacost administration. It was later revealed that the donors involved were John and Rosemary Galbraith, a former Eckerd trustee and board chairman, as well as a retired mutual fund executive and philanthropist. The library was planned to hold 300,000 books and be twice as large as the previous library at the Cobb center, opened in 1962. Construction of the library would be left to Ayers/Saint/Gross interdisciplinary design firm.

Since its opening, Armacost Library has had several changes to the building. In 2018, The Current, Eckerd's campus newspaper, reported that students were concerned about the lack of gender-neutral bathrooms in the library. As of 2022, construction was completed on gender-neutral bathrooms on the library's first floor. In 2021, the first Seed Library was established within the Armacost Library.

== Student life and activities ==
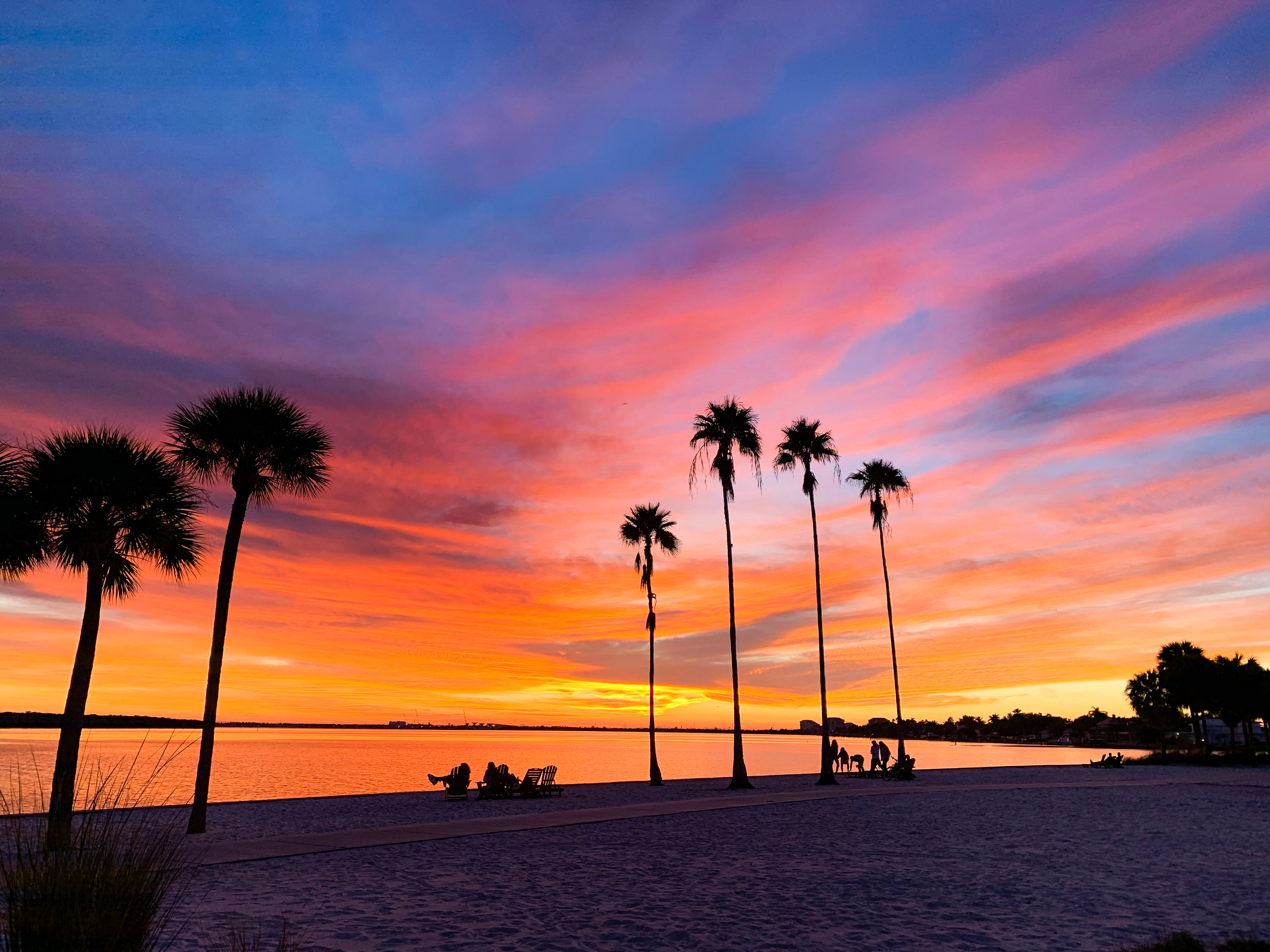
Students enjoy the sunset view from Eckerd College's campus

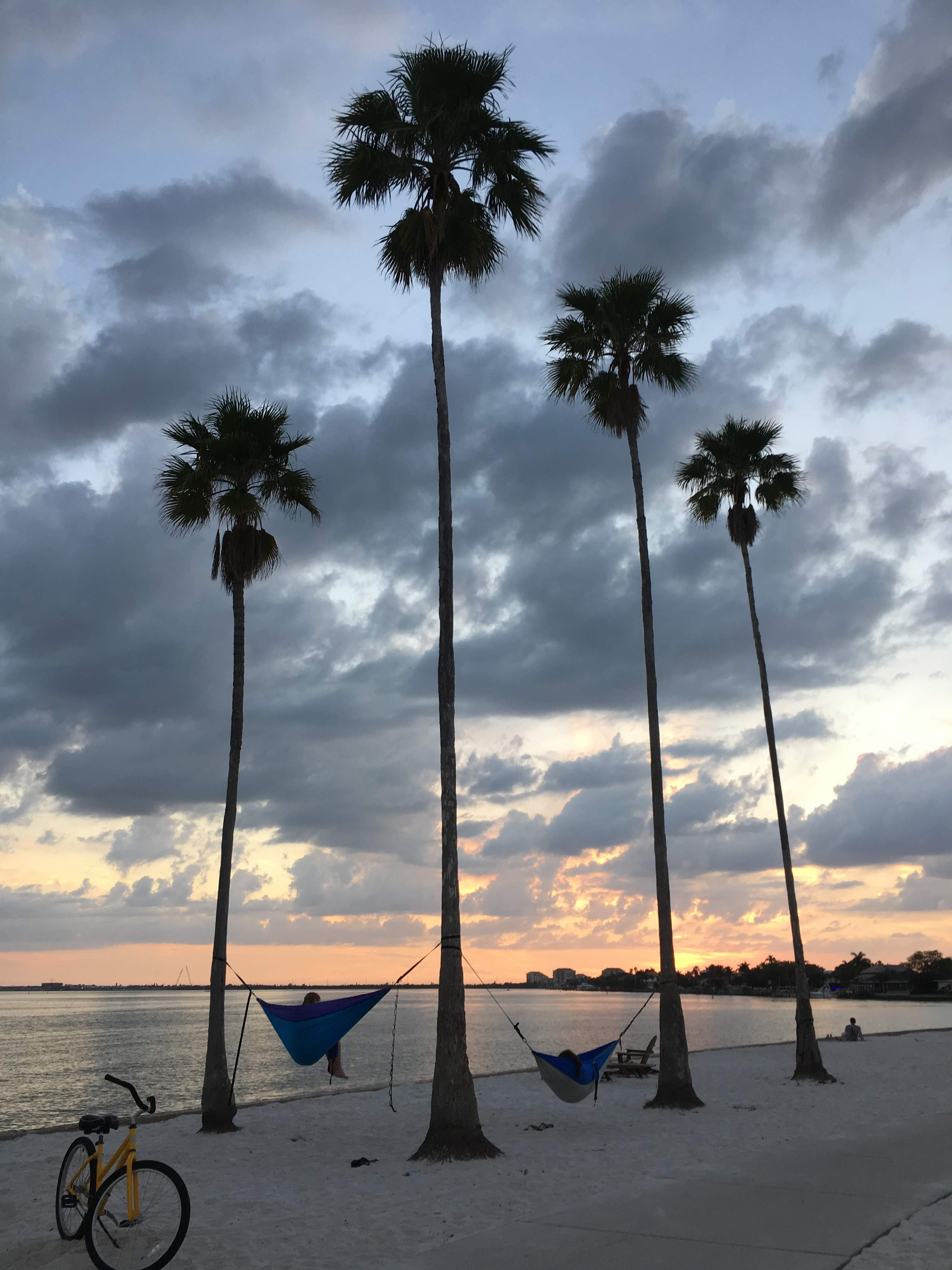
Eckerd College South Beach at sunset

Eckerd College maintains a regular series of on-campus events for the benefit and enjoyment of campus and community. The music, theatre, and visual arts programs are active in staging concerts, dramatic productions, and exhibitions, respectively, throughout the academic year. On-campus speakers have included, among many others, the late nobel laureate in economics Milton Friedman, the late Israeli Foreign Minister Abba Eban, Jimmy Carter, Michael Collins, Anderson Cooper, Jared Diamond, Gerald Ford, Jesse Jackson, Coretta Scott King, Stephen King, Henry Kissinger, Richard Leakey, Dennis Lehane (a 1988 Eckerd grad), Seyyed Hossein Nasr, Paul Rusesabagina, Peter Singer, James Van Allen, Elie Wiesel, Yevgeny Yevtushenko, Gloria Steinem, Billy Collins, Bill McKibben, Piper Kerman, Opal Tometi, and Ibram X. Kendi.

Eckerd's student government, the Eckerd College Organization of Students, gives an annual total of more than $500,000 to more than 100 student-run clubs and organizations, including Eckerd's student newspaper (The Current), a student literary journal (Eckerd Review) a student radio station (WECX), a student activities board (Palmetto Productions) sports clubs, cultural clubs, religious clubs, political clubs, community service clubs and various academic-related clubs, such as those for anthropology, art, biology, chemistry, philosophy, law, and foreign languages.

Among the service clubs are campus chapters of Colleges Against Cancer and the Public Interest Research Group (PIRG). Eckerd College also has hosted the EC Coalition for Community Justice, a group seeking to raise campus housekeepers' wages, and is one of only a few schools in Florida to join the nationally recognized Peace Corps Prep undergraduate certificate program—helping adventurous students prepare to serve humanity after graduation.

Eckerd's Waterfront Program is a center of watersport activities—such as sailing, kiteboarding, paddle boarding, kayaking, and fishing. An award-winning student group, Eckerd College Search and Rescue (EC-SAR), helps the U.S. Coast Guard in rescue operations throughout the Tampa Bay area.

The student-run Eckerd College Emergency Response Team, composed of professionally trained emergency medical technicians, not only prepares undergraduates for careers as first responders but is committed to aiding campus community members during medical emergencies

About 90% of Eckerd students live in on-campus residence halls. Eckerd College has 12 residence hall complexes, most with a name from the Greek alphabet. Among these, Alpha, Beta, Gamma, Delta, Epsilon, Zeta, Kappa, and Iota complexes offer traditional dorm-style housing. Omega and Nu complexes house upperclass students, and are organized around suites on each floor. Sigma and West Lodge offer an on-campus hotel style of living, with each room having its own individual bathroom. The newest dorm complex, Iota, opened on September 30, 2006.

Since 1973, Eckerd College has set aside pet-friendly housing for students wishing to bring small animals to campus. Every spring, a separate graduation ceremony is held for graduating seniors' pets, complete with certificates presented by the president. The college also built a pet park in 2014 for community use.

== Environmental sustainability ==
In 2011, the Eckerd College Sustainability Program was founded.

In 2013, Sustainability Fellow (now Director) Evan Bollier '11 started "Trash to Treasure," an initiative where volunteer students collect abandoned items after students move out and sell them to students returning the next year. The college has several other green initiatives including a bike sharing program, campus recycling and composting.

In 2013, the college installed a 50-kilowatt solar-powered system, the first solar initiative on campus.

In 2019, then-President Donald R. Eastman III signed a pledge to prohibit college funds from being used to buy most nonessential single-use plastics.

In 2021, Eckerd College appeared on the Princeton Review's list of Green Colleges for its sustainability efforts, and it continues to participate in the Tree Campus USA program as it works to sustain a healthy community forest in its natural Florida setting.

In 2022, Eckerd was named one of six colleges and universities in the second cohort of the National Academies of Sciences, Engineering, and Medicine Gulf Research Program's "Gulf Scholars Program," a pilot program designed to prepare undergraduate students to address the most pressing environmental, health, energy and infrastructure challenges in the Gulf of Mexico region. It was the smallest institution so awarded: the others were the University of Central Florida, Louisiana State University, the University of South Alabama, the University of Southern Mississippi and Texas A&M University at Corpus Christi.

== Athletics ==
Eckerd College is a founding member of the Sunshine State Conference (NCAA Division II) fielding 14 athletic teams in coed and women's sailing, men's and women's basketball, men's and women's soccer, men's baseball, women's indoor volleyball and beach volleyball, men's and women's golf, men's and women's tennis, and women's softball. The Eckerd varsity sailing team competes nationally as a member of the SAISA (the South Atlantic Intercollegiate Sailing Association) and is a member of the ICSA (Intercollegiate Sailing Association), having made an appearance in the Match Race Nationals in 2019.

The college's basketball and indoor volleyball teams play in the McArthur Physical Education Center's gymnasium. A swimming pool, adjacent to the gym, is open to all students. Eckerd's mascot is the Triton, and the school's colors—teal, navy and black—were adopted by the Athletics program in 2005; previously the school's colors had been black, red, and white.

In 2006, for the first time in the 24-year history of the Eckerd College women's volleyball program, the Tritons qualified for the NCAA South Region tournament. Head coach Paul Honsinger has led this team to 2 SSC Regular Season Championships (2017-18 & 2025-26) Paul has also graduated 7 All American Athletes in his 20+ years of coaching. Ashton Feldhaus, the former assistant coach during the 2023-24 season, led the team to five consecutive appearances in NCAAII tournament appearances. This won her the prestigious award "30 under 30" given to the best 30 coaches across the country under the age of thirty.

In addition to Division II teams, Eckerd students participate in club sports such as men's and women's rugby, lacrosse, and ultimate. The men's club lacrosse team finished the 2006 season ranked No. 3 in the National Collegiate Club Lacrosse Poll, with a 13–1 record. Since its founding in 2003, the team captured two state championships, a regional championship, and a third-place national finish. In 2000, the Eckerd's men's club volleyball team won the NIRSA Division II Sports Club Volleyball Championships in Reno, Nevada. In 2019, the Eckerd Sirens Women's Rugby team finished #3 in Division II rugby XVs and #5 in NSCRO 7s.

In 2020, the college received the Presidents' Award from the NCAA after boasting an Academic Success Rate (ASR) of 94—marking the 10th consecutive year Eckerd has achieved an ASR of 90 or above. Also in 2020, the Eckerd Athletics Department was a finalist for the NCAA Division II Award of Excellence for its work with the 10th annual Christmas for Kids event held in December 2019. Eckerd Athletics was recognized for conducting events that promote student-athletes giving back and serving as leaders within their communities or on their campus.

== Notable people ==
=== Alumni ===
==== Arts ====
- Dorothy Allison (1971), writer
- Levi Hummon (2012, non-degreed alumnus), country music artist, singer and songwriter
- Douglas Lain, novelist
- Dennis Lehane (1988), writer, Mystic River and Gone Baby Gone, former writer-in-residence and co-founder/co-director of the Writers in Paradise conference.
- Arto Lindsay, guitarist, singer, record producer and experimental composer
- Jay Baron Nicorvo (1999), writer

==== Politics ====
- Stephen Bassett, first UFO lobbyist in the United States
- Jeffrey J. Berger (1978), state representative, District 73 district, Connecticut House of Representatives
- Frank Farkas (1993), former Florida State Representative
- James L. Gale (1969), judge, North Carolina Business Court
- Bob Gualtieri (2000), law enforcement officer, lawyer, and politician
- Michael P. Hein (1987), county executive of Ulster County, New York
- Janet Long (2002), member of the Florida House of Representatives
- Kathleen Peters, Florida House of Representatives, 2012–2018

==== Science and technology ====
- Carlos Barbas III (1985), former chemist for Scripps Research Institute whose research focused on developing therapeutic approaches to treating cancer and HIV
- Bill Curtis (1971), software engineer who led the development of the Capability Maturity Model
- Hank Green (2002), novelist, YouTuber, science communicator, and entrepreneur
- Laura Helmuth (1991), editor in chief of Scientific American
- Tessa M. Hill (1999), associate vice provost for academic programs—public scholarship and engagement, University of California, Davis
- Aaron D. O'Connell (2005), creator of the world's first quantum machine
- Mark Pauline (1977), founder and director of Survival Research Labs
- James W. Pennebaker (1971), social psychologist
- Mark Tluszcz (1989), venture capitalist known for Skype and Wix
- Stephen Updegraff (1984), early contributor to LASIK

==== Sports ====
- Craig Albernaz (2005), Major League Baseball manager for the Baltimore Orioles
- Steve Balboni (1978), former New York Yankees first baseman
- Lara Dallman-Weiss (2011), sailor who represented Team USA in the 2020 Summer Olympics
- Bill Evers (1976), bench coach of the Tampa Bay Devil Rays, former Major League Baseball player
- Joe Lefebvre (1979), former outfielder for New York Yankees and Philadelphia Phillies
- Jim Mecir (1992), former Major League Baseball player
- Jon Mueller (1992), college baseball coach at Albany
- Brian Sabean (1978), general manager of the San Francisco Giants
- Carlos Somoano (1992), head coach of the University of North Carolina men's soccer team
- Jay Washington (2004), professional basketball player in PBA

=== Retired or part-time faculty ===
- David Eugene Henry, artist (former part-time faculty)
- Dennis Lehane, writer, Mystic River and Gone Baby Gone
- Jamsheed Marker, diplomat (former diplomat-in-residence)
- Peter Meinke, writer, Florida poet laureate (retired faculty member)
- James Michener, writer (former part-time faculty)
- John Prevas, writer (former scholar-in-residence/faculty)
- Sterling Watson, writer, 1969 alumnus, retired faculty, and co-founder/former co-director of Writers in Paradise
- Elie Wiesel, Romanian-born American writer, political activist, Nobel Peace Prize laureate, and Holocaust survivor (visiting faculty 1993–2016)

== See also ==
- Independent Colleges and Universities of Florida
