= Damián J. Fernández =

American academic administrator

10th President of Warren Wilson College
- Incumbent
- Assumed office June 1, 2023
- Preceded by: Lynn Morton

Personal details
- Education: Princeton University (BA); University of Florida (MA); University of Miami (PhD)

Damián J. Fernández is an American academic administrator and political scientist who is the 10th president of Warren Wilson College. Fernández assumed office on June 1, 2023, succeeding Lynn Morton. He previously was the fifth president of Eckerd College.

== Early life and education ==
Fernández was born in Cuba and immigrated to Puerto Rico as a child. He earned a Bachelor of Arts in international relations with a minor in Latin American studies from the Princeton School of Public and International Affairs. He later earned a Master of Arts in Latin American studies from the University of Florida and PhD in international relations from the University of Miami.

== Career ==
Fernández began his career as a high school educator at Phillips Academy. He later worked as an instructor at Colorado College and associate dean at St. Thomas University. Fernández served as vice president for academic affairs at the State University of New York at Purchase and vice provost at Florida International University. Fernández served as CEO and head of school of Ethical Culture Fieldston School.

From 2016 to 2020, Fernández served as chancellor of the Penn State Abington. He assumed office as president of Eckerd College on July 1, 2020, succeeding Donald R. Eastman III. He became the 10th president of Warren Wilson College on June 1, 2023, succeeding Lynn Morton.

As an academic, Fernández's research focuses on international relations and Cuban politics.
