= Warren Wilson College =

Private liberal arts college in Swannanoa, North Carolina, U.S.

- Former names: Asheville Farm School (1894–1942); Warren Wilson Vocational Junior College and Associated Schools (1942–1966)
- Motto: Learning to do by doing
- Type: Private liberal arts college
- Established: 1894; 132 years ago
- Religious affiliation: Presbyterian Church (USA)
- Endowment: $66.4 million (2025)
- President: Damián J. Fernández
- Faculty: 54 full-time, 46 part-time
- Undergraduates: 711
- Postgraduates: 67
- Location: Swannanoa, North Carolina, U.S. 35°36′39″N 82°26′31″W
- Campus: 1,135 acres (459 ha); Rural
- Colors: Dark green, blue
- Nickname: Owls
- Sporting affiliations: USCAA – EMAC; NCAA Division III – Coast to Coast Athletic Conference
- Website: warren-wilson.edu

Warren Wilson College (WWC) is a private liberal arts college work college in Swannanoa, North Carolina. It is known for its curriculum that combines academics with work and service. Warren Wilson is a member of the Work Colleges Consortium. It opened in 1894 as the Asheville Farm School, becoming a junior college in 1942 and a four-year college in 1966.

== History ==
=== Asheville Farm School ===
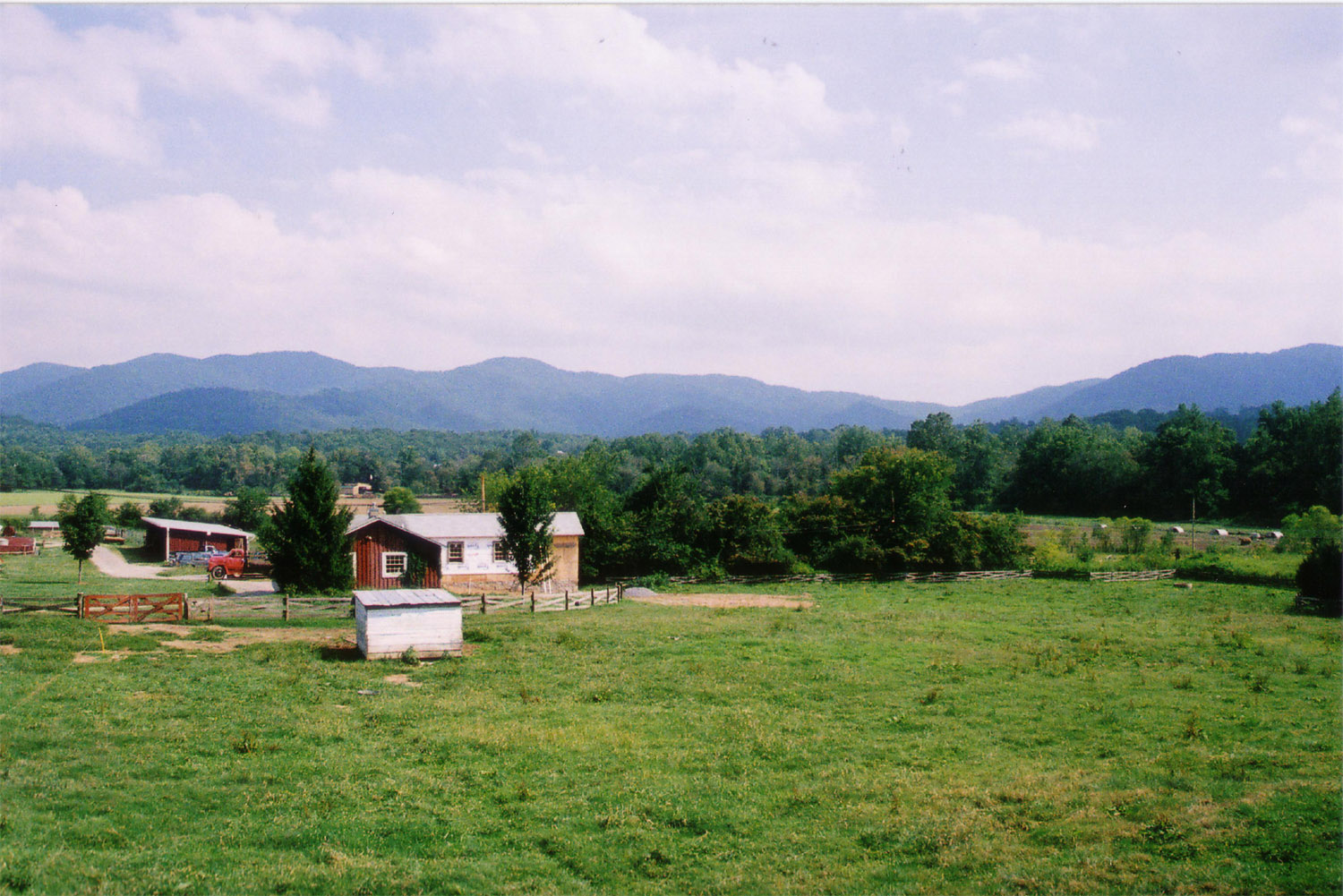
Warren Wilson College Farm in 2007.

In 1893, the Women's Board of Home Missions of the Presbyterian Church purchased land in Swannanoa, North Carolina to establish one of their many church-supported schools for impoverished areas. On November 30, 1894, the Asheville Farm School officially opened as a mission of the Presbyterian Church on the 420 acres (170 ha) farm.

The school initially had 25 male students, but had received 150 applications. A professional staff of three offered the first three grades of elementary instruction; Samuel Jeffrey was its first superindendant. The school combined primary and secondary education with farm work. Students graduated after the eighth grade.

By 1900, the buildings on campus allowed for 140 students. Most of the students were in their teens and twenties. The students were taught the basics of agriculture to produce food and also cooked, cleaned, did laundry, and maintained the campus. The work program provided a way for students to cover their expenses. In 1910, the students dammed the Swannanoa River, bringing electricity to the school.

The school's main building burned down in late December 1914. "Old Main" was a four-story frame structure that housed classrooms, student rooms, faculty apartments, the kitchen and dining room, laundry, and showers. The tragedy was followed by a major flood of the river and an influenza epidemic. World War I caused shortages and inflation, resulting in smaller church budgets. When superintendent Dr. D. J. Roger resigned, some leaders of the church considered closing the school.

In the era of post-war prosperity, the state of North Carolina established more public schools, further reducing the need for the Asheville Farm School. The school responded by adding a high school, graduating its first class in 1924. A Presbyterian church was established at the school in 1925 so students and teachers would no longer have to walk three miles to Riceville. Henry S. Randolph became the school's superintendent in 1925. Randolph was a native of the mountains of Tennessee, but had received a doctorate from the Teachers College of Columbia University. He led the school through the Great Depression, recruiting a faculty that helped develop a plan for the institution's future. In 1936, the school began offering post-high school programs and vocational training. Randolph also added a college preparatory curriculum, before leaving in 1938 to become the National Missions Board's Secretary of Rural Church Work.

=== Junior college ===
After delays caused by World War II, the Asheville Farm School merged with the Dorland-Bell School in Hot Springs, North Carolina, a Presbyterian girls' school, to become a coed secondary school in 1942. The Natonal Missions Board renamed the merged institution Warren H. Wilson Vocational Junior College and Associated Schools in honor of Warren Hugh Wilson, a leader in the Presbytarian Church's rural mission work. The junior college opened in April 1942. Arthur Bannerman was the college's first president, serving from 1942 to 1971.

After World War II, the public education system in North Carolina improved dramatically, and the need for the high school diminished. The college began admitting international students, in collaboration with the American Field Service and Presbyterian Church overseas missions. Work remained part of the college's program, with each student contributing twenty hours a week. This helped reduce the cost of attending the college.

In 1952, the college became one of the first in the South to desegregate when it invited Alma Shippy, an African American boy from Swannanoa, to attend. Sunderland dorm residents voted 54 to 1 to allow Shippy to become a student and live in their dorm. During the 1950s, Bannerman traveled throughout the country, raising funds and promoting the college. This afforded the addition of new campus buildings, eventually expanding enrollment to 450 students. However, high school enrollment in declined in the 1950s, and the last high school class graduated in 1957. In 1959, the college began requiring its students to provide service to graduate.

=== Warren Wilson College ===
In 1965, the Wilson Vocational Junior College developed a plan to become a four-year college. In 1966, it became Warren Wilson College, a four-year college that offered a Bachelor of Arts degree. This necessitated the expansion of the college's faculty. In 1967, the curriculum was improved with a focus on gaining accreditation, while also maintaining the institution's unique traditions and character.

Warren Wilson College's first four-year students graduated in 1969. In 1972, the National Board of Missions deeded the WWC property to the college's Board of Trustees. Thus, the college was no longer associated with the Presbyterian Church as of 1973. The college added its first graduate program in 1981.

Reuben "Ben" Holden became the college's second president in 1971. Serving until 1986, Holden was a Yale University alumnus who had spent 25 years there in administrative positions. Under his leadership, additions included a new liberal arts curriculum and new majors such as interdisciplinary studies and environmental studies. Holden also added a Master's of Fine Arts in creative writing program that focused on residencies of noted writers and poets.

Warren Wilson is a member of the North Carolina Independent Colleges & Universities and the Work Colleges Consortium. Damián J. Fernández became the college' president in June 2023.

=== Presidents ===
- Arthur Bannerman (1942–1971)
- Reuben A. "Ben" Holden (1971–1986)
- John J. Carey (1986–1988)
- Alfred O. Canon (Interim, 1988–1989, 1989–1992)
- Doug Orr Jr. (1992–2006)
- Sandy Pfeiffer (2006 –2012)
- Stephn Solnick (2012–2017)
- Lynn Morton (2017–2022)
- Bill Chirstie (Interim, 2022–2023)
- Damián J. Fernández (2023–to date)

== Campus ==
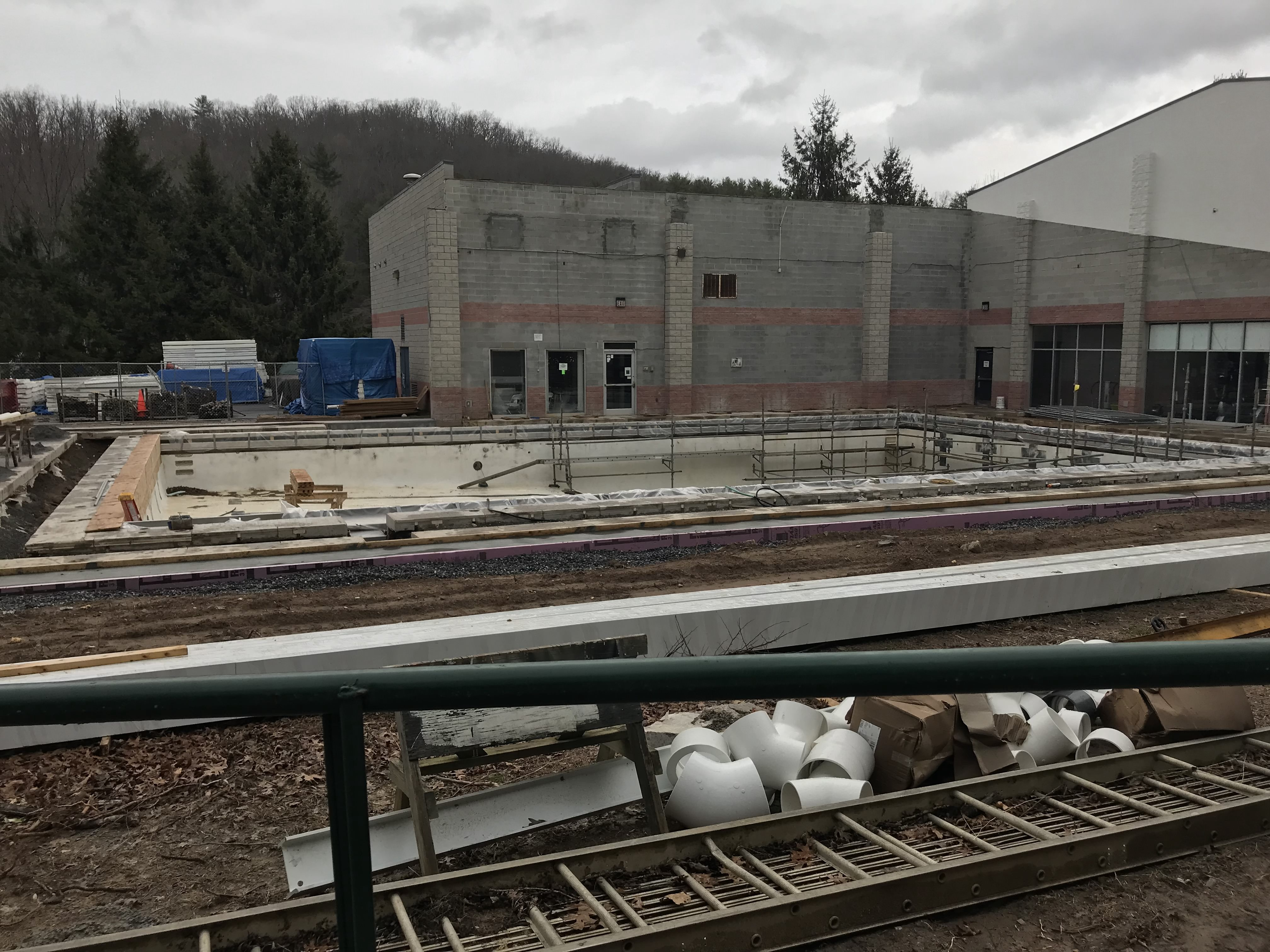
Warren Wilson College Pool, construction Feb. 2018

Warren Wilson College is located on 1,135 acres in Swannanoa, North Carolina, about ten miles east of Asheville, North Carolina. Its setting is rural. The property of the college is situated along the Swannanoa River.

A new academic building, Myron Boon Hall, was constructed on the site formerly occupied by Carson Hall; it was completed in May 2018. The building is LEED Gold Certified.

The college's pool has been closed since 2014 when repairs to structural beams were deemed too expensive. Demolition and construction of a new pool structure began in 2017. Buncombe County contributed $300,000 to the project, with the understanding that local swim teams would also be able to use the pool. Construction encountered major setbacks. Although originally planned to be completed for the 2017–18 swim season, work on the internal aspects of the pool were still underway as of May 2023. In October 2025, the college was awarded $1.6 million by the Buncombe County Tourism Product Development Fund to complete and upgrade Warren Wilson College's Aquatic Center. Construction is expected to begin in October 2026 and reach completion by the spring of 2027.

== Academics ==
=== Degrees and programs ===
Warren Wilson offers a Bachelor of Arts, a Bachelor of Science, and a Master of Fine Arts in Creative Writing. Popular undergraduate majors include sociology, anthropology, visual and performing arts, environmental studies, biology, and psychology. In addition to academic classwork, students are required to contribute three hours of labor daily in return for room and board.

=== Students ===
In the fall of 2025, the college had 711 undergraduate students and 67 graduate students. Of those students, 66.7 percent are female and 33.3 percent are male; 75 percent are White, 9 percent are Hispanic, 7 percent are Black, 4 percent are mixed race, 1 percent are American Indian, 1 percent are Asian, and 3 percent are international. 62 percent of the students are from outside of North Carolina, with 18 foreign countries being represented. Of its first-year students, 69 percent received need-based financial aid, and the four-year graduation rate is 47 percent. The student to faculty ratio is 12 to 1.

=== Rankings ===
U.S. News & World Report Best Colleges Ranking, 2027 edition, ranked Warren Wilson College as no. 181 in national liberal arts colleges, no. 153 in top private schools, and no. 40 in most innovative schools. It was also ranked no. 17 in service learning.

== Campus life ==
91 percent of Warren Wilson's students live on campus. The college does not have fraternities, sororities, or ROTC. It has a variety of intramural sports and 32 student organizations, 2 religious organizations, and 3 honor societies. Students publish a campus newspaper and literary magazine. There are also support groups for LGBT and minority students.

== Athletics ==
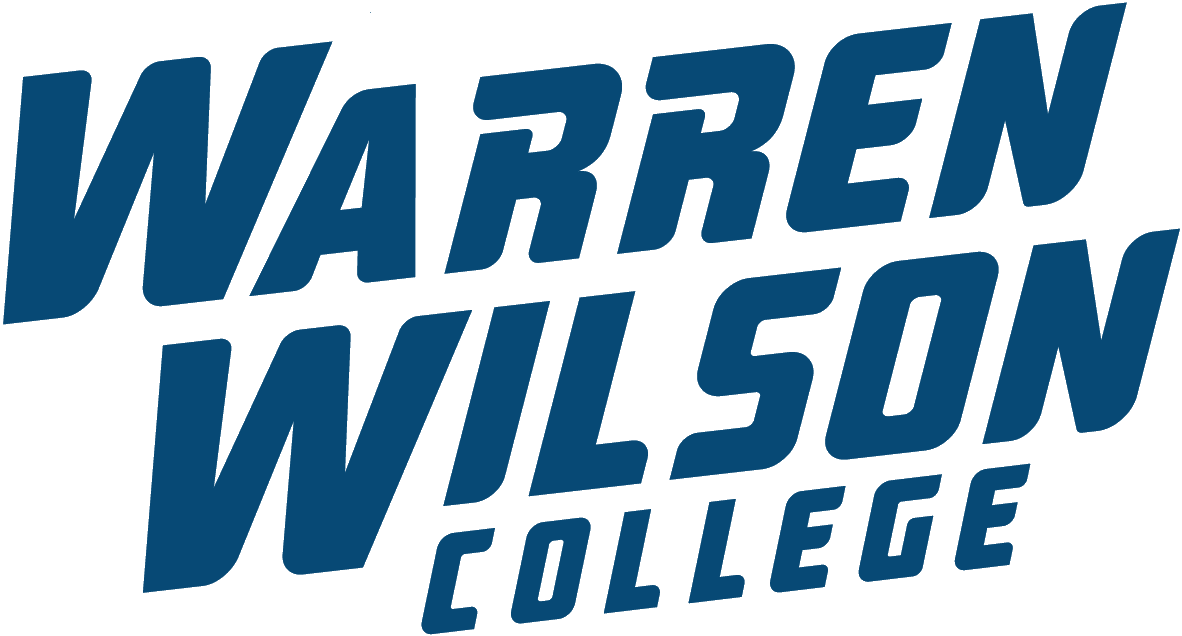
Warren Wilson Owls wordmark

The Warren Wilson athletic teams are called the Owls. Its colors are dark green and blue.

The college's intercollegiate varsity sports for men include basketball, cross country, cycling, lacrosse, soccer, swimming, track and field, and volleyball. Women's sports include basketball, cross country, cycling, lacrosse, rugby, soccer, swimming, track and field, and volleyball. The college also has a club team for men's rugby. At one point, the college also had football, baseball, and tennis teams, although they have not existed for decades.

The college is a member of the NCAA Division III ranks, primarily competing in the Coast to Coast Athletic Conference (C2C) for most of its sports since the 2022–23 academic year. Its men's and women's swimming teams compete in the Sun Coast Swimming Conference (SCSC). The college's cycling teams are governed by USA Cycling (USAC).

The Owls previously competed as an NCAA D-III Independent from 2020–21 to 2021–22, and as an NAIA Independent within the Association of Independent Institutions (AII) of the National Association of Intercollegiate Athletics (NAIA) from 2010–11 to 2011–12. Warren Wilson was also a member of the United States Collegiate Athletic Association (USCAA), primarily competing as a founding member of the Eastern Metro Athletic Conference (EMAC) for most of its sports from 2018–19 to 2019–20;

=== Accomplishments ===
The mountain biking team finished on the podium for foruteen consecutive years at collegiate national championships until 2016, when they won the team omnium in Varsity Division II. In 2017 they finished fourth, for a sixteenth consecutive year on the podium. Although the mountain biking team was formed in the 1990s, the road and cyclocross teams were not added until much later. They did not compete at the national championship level until the 2013–14 and 2014–15 academic years, respectively. In 2016, the cyclocross team placed fourth in the DII team omnium at nationals and third in the team relay.

The men's basketball team won the USCAA DII national title in 2013. The women's cross-country team won the USCAA national title in 2000.
