= Dorland-Bell School =

Former mission school in North Carolina, United States

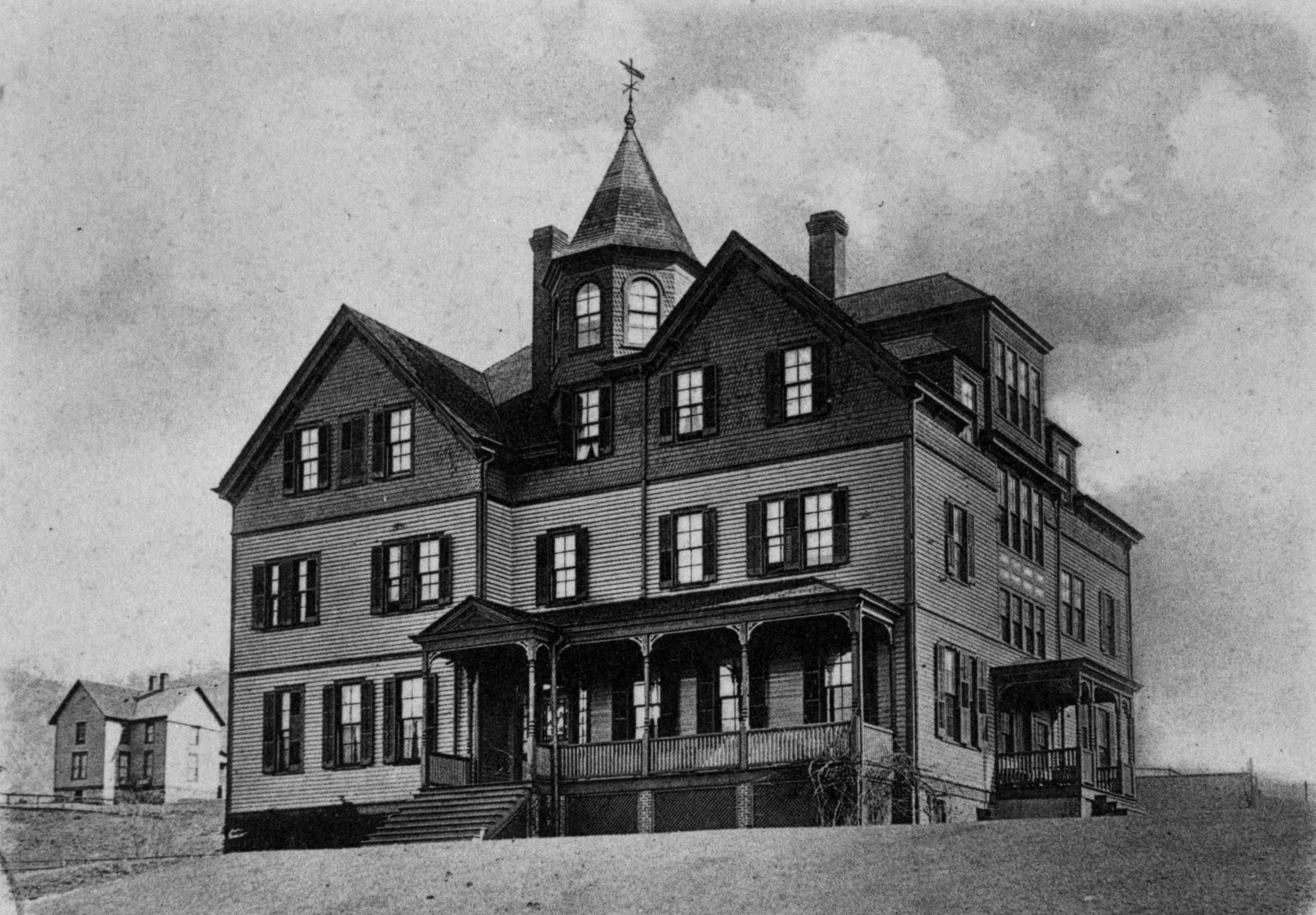
Dorland Institute, c. 1906.

The Dorland-Bell School was a mission school in Hot Springs, North Carolina, United States. It was founded in 1886, when Luke and Juliette Dorland, Presbyterian missionaries and educators, retired to Hot Springs. At the request of area residents, they established a school in Hot Springs and soon were teaching 25 students in their home.

Luke Dorland appealed to his former employer, the Presbyterian Board of Home Missions, and $300 was granted for books and equipment. At their own expense, the Dorlands built a two-story frame schoolhouse to accommodate the growing number of students.

By 1894, the school, now known as the Dorland Institute, had grown to include a girls' dormitory, an expanded schoolhouse, and additional teachers.

In 1918, the Dorland Institute merged with the Bell Institute, a large day school for girls, to form the Dorland-Bell School. At this time, the Dorland-Bell School included 7 acres (28,000 m^{2}) of land, boarding facilities for 100 girls in the village, and a 300-acre (1.2 km^{2}) farm with housing for 40 boys.

When Dorland-Bell School closed in 1942, it merged with the Asheville Farm School to form what is now Warren Wilson College.

== See also ==
- Warren Wilson College
