= Donald R. Eastman III =

American academic administrator

Dr. Donald Eastman

4th President of Eckerd College
- In office 2001–2020
- Preceded by: Eugene Hotchkiss
- Succeeded by: Damian J. Fernandez

Personal details
- Education: University of Tennessee (BA); University of Florida (PhD)

Donald R. Eastman III is an American academic administrator who served as the fourth President of Eckerd College from 2001 to 2020.

== Education ==
Eastman enrolled at Emory University in Atlanta, Georgia in 1963, but soon transferred to the University of Tennessee in Knoxville, where he was a member of Omicron Delta Kappa and received a Bachelor of Arts degree in 1968. He earned a PhD from the University of Florida and also attended Harvard University. While an undergraduate at Emory, he became a member of the Phi Delta Theta fraternity, and he continued his active membership in the Fraternity while at Tennessee.

== Career ==
From 1989 to 1990, Eastman was the Executive Director of University Communications at Cornell University. From 1991 to 1998, he served as the Vice President for University Relations at the University of Georgia. In 2001 he became the President of Eckerd College.

At the beginning Eastman's tenure as President of Eckerd College, the institution has been warned that it might lose its accreditation. Eastman was criticized for insensitive remarks regarding rape. However, by the end of his presidency, Eastman was credited with doubling applications for admission to Eckerd, providing more student housing, and improving the college's stature after its financial scandals.

In November 2019, Eastman announced that he would retire from his position. Eastman officially retired on June 30, 2020, having served the second-longest term of any Eckerd College president. Eastman was succeeded as president by Damián J. Fernández, the previous chancellor of Penn State Abington.
