= Sterling Watson =

American writer

Sterling Watson M.A.
- Occupations: Writer and screenwriter Professor
- Writing career
- Subject: Fiction

Sterling Watson, M.A., is a fiction writer, screenwriter, and was the former director of the Writing Workshop at Eckerd College in St. Petersburg, Florida.

== Early life and education ==
Watson received his Master of Arts from the University of Florida. He served as the former director of the Writing Workshop for Eckerd College in St. Petersburg, Florida.

== Career ==
Watson's first three novels are Weep No More My Brother, The Calling, and Blind Tongues. Deadly Sweet is the first in his Eddie Priest series of novels. He's a co-author with Dennis Lehane of the screenplay Bad Blood. His main professional interests are fiction, playwriting, screenwriting, American, British and European short and long fiction, and the theater. He was for five years the fiction editor of The Florida Quarterly and taught secondary English and later fiction writing at Raiford Prison. He has won four Florida Arts Council Grants for fiction writing.

In January 2007, Watson participated in Eckerd College's third annual Writers in Paradise writing program which he co-created and co-directs with Lehane.

In January 2023, he released the book Night Letter.
