= John Prevas =

John Prevas is a historian, classics scholar, author, and mediator.

Prevas was scholar in residence and assistant professor of classics at Eckerd College from 2001 until 2011 teaching courses in ancient Greek and Roman history, Latin, and law. He has been visiting professor of classics at the University of South Florida since 2015. He is the author of Hannibal Crosses The Alps (2001), Xenophon's March: Into the Lair of the Persian Lion (2002), and Envy of the Gods (2004), a history of Alexander the Great's ill-fated journey through the Gedrosian Desert in Pakistan. and the 2009NYT's best seller, Power Ambition Glory co-authored with Steve Forbes. His latest book is Hannibal's Oath (DaCapo Books 2017).

Prevas was born in Baltimore, Maryland and received his undergraduate degree in history from the University of Maryland, a master's degree in educational psychology from Johns Hopkins University, a master's degree in political science from the University of Maryland, and a law degree from Antioch School of Law, Washington, D.C. He was featured in the 2002 History Channel program Unconventional Warfare discussing Hannibal's invasion of Italy by crossing the Alps and in a BBC National Geographic film on Hannibal in 2008.

As of 2022, Prevas continues working as a court-appointed mediator for the Florida sixth judicial circuit and teaching the classics while working on his next book on the ancient world.
