= Eckerd College Search and Rescue =

- Formation: 1971
- Founded at: St. Petersburg, Florida
- Parent organization: Eckerd College
- Website: https://www.eckerd.edu/waterfront/ecsar/

Eckerd College Search and Rescue (EC-SAR) is a student volunteer maritime search and rescue team. EC-SAR provides its services free of charge to the St. Petersburg / Tampa Bay area of Florida, from its station on the Eckerd College campus. EC-SAR works alongside local EMS services and the United States Coast Guard. For emergency assistance EC-SAR can be contacted on VHF channels 16 and 68, phone number (727) 864–8256, or through Coast Guard Sector St. Petersburg. Along with providing its services to the community, EC-SAR seeks to better the students by "Education through Service," building leadership and team skills.

== History ==
In 1971 the team was created for the safety of the college's own vessels in the Waterfront Program. By 1977 EC-SAR expanded its services to the Tampa Bay area community. EC-SAR gained national attention in 1980 when it was one of the first agencies to respond to the Sunshine Skyway Bridge disaster.

EC-SAR was rated "Best Student Group" in Florida Leader's "Best of Florida Schools 2003" issue.

Members coordinate the utilization of four rescue boats through an operations/communications center located in the Waterfront Activities building. Students are rigorously trained in seamanship and handling boats, as well as a variety of rescue techniques. They are also trained to operate radios and correspond with other organizations such as the Coast Guard, the local police department and the fire department. EC-SAR responds to over 600 cases per year.

== Services ==
Within their response range, including all of Tampa Bay and up to ten miles into the Gulf of Mexico from Longboat Pass to John's Pass, some services provided include:

- Towing

Using a variety of techniques, disabled vessels are towed to the place of nearest safe mooring.

- Groundings

Grounded vessels are pulled off and towed to the nearest safe mooring.

- Dewatering

Stopping the flow of water into a vessel and removing the water already in the vessel.

- Parbuckling

Righting an overturned vessel.

- Firefighting

Putting out fires that have started on boats, and occasionally towing burning boats away from populous areas.

- Searching

Searching for people or objects, including overdue vessels, overdue people and people who have jumped from the Sunshine Skyway Bridge.

- Medical Assistance

First responders stabilize injured patients and transport them to land where local EMS can meet them.

== Awards ==
In 2015, the St. Petersburg Police Department awarded EC-SAR a grant for $8,000.

In 2019, EC-SAR received the Meritorious Public Service Award, the second-highest of the Coast Guard public Service Awards, from the United States Coast Guard.
