= Breakthrough of the Year =

Annual award for scientific research

- Description: Annual scientific honor recognizing the most significant development in research across all scientific fields
- Country: United States
- Presented by: Science (AAAS)

The Breakthrough of the Year is an annual award for the most significant development in scientific research made by the AAAS journal Science, an academic journal covering all branches of science.

Originating in 1989 as the Molecule of the Year, and inspired by Time's Person of the Year, it was renamed the Breakthrough of the Year in 1996.

== Molecule of the Year ==
- 1989 PCR and DNA polymerase
- 1990 the manufacture of synthetic diamonds
- 1991 buckminsterfullerene
- 1992 nitric oxide
- 1993 p53
- 1994 DNA repair enzyme

== Breakthrough of the Year ==
- 1996: Understanding HIV
- 1997: Dolly the sheep, the first mammal to be cloned from adult cells
- 1998: Accelerating universe
- 1999: Prospective stem-cell therapies
- 2000: Full genome sequencing
- 2001: Nanocircuits or Molecular circuit
- 2002: RNA interference
- 2003: Dark energy
- 2004: Spirit rover landed on Mars
- 2005: Evolution in action
- 2006: Proof of the Poincaré conjecture
- 2007: Human genetic variation
- 2008: Cellular reprogramming
- 2009: Ardipithecus ramidus
- 2010: The first quantum machine
- 2011: HIV treatment as prevention (HPTN 052)
- 2012: Discovery of the Higgs boson
- 2013: Cancer immunotherapy
- 2014: Rosetta comet mission
- 2015: CRISPR genome-editing method
- 2016: First observation of gravitational waves
- 2017: Neutron star merger (GW170817)
- 2018: Single-cell sequencing
- 2019: A black hole made visible
- 2020: COVID-19 vaccine, developed and tested at record speed
- 2021: An AI brings protein structures to all
- 2022: James Webb Space Telescope debut
- 2023: GLP-1 Drugs
- 2024: Lenacapavir
- 2025: The unstoppable rise of renewable energy

== See also ==
- Physics World – also has a Breakthrough of the Year award
