= Andrew N. Cleland =

American physicist

Andrew N. Cleland (born 17 September 1961) is an American physicist, and is currently the John A. MacLean Sr. Professor for Molecular Engineering Innovation and Enterprise at the Pritzker School of Molecular Engineering at the University of Chicago.

== Education ==
Cleland received his Bachelor of Science in engineering physics at the University of California at Berkeley in 1983, and his PhD in physics in 1991, also at the University of California at Berkeley. He pursued postdoctoral research at the Centre d'Etudes Nucleaires (CEN) in Saclay, France, then worked as a postdoc and ultimately as a senior research fellow at the California Institute of Technology, before joining the faculty of the Department of Physics at the University of California at Santa Barbara. In 2014, he joined the new Institute for Molecular Engineering at the University of Chicago, now the Pritzker School of Molecular Engineering. He is currently also the Director of the Pritzker Nanofabrication Facility at the University of Chicago.

== Career ==
Cleland has made significant contributions to the fields of superconductivity, in particular the development of Josephson junction-based superconducting quantum circuits, as well as in the fields of nanomechanics, and microfluidics. He has published over 130 refereed journal articles, as well as a textbook on nanomechanics. He has also given over 200 invited presentations. His work on demonstrating the operation of a mechanical structure in its quantum ground state, as well as demonstrating quantum entanglement between the mechanical system and a superconducting quantum bit, was awarded the Breakthrough of the Year by Science magazine in 2010.

Cleland currently holds two U.S. patents, one for the invention of a new method for detecting and measuring the size of nanoparticles in solution; this patent is the basis of a new commercial venture.

== Honors and awards ==
- Olli V. Lounasmaa Memorial Prize (2025)
- Class of 2024 Vannevar Bush Faculty Fellow
- 2023 Fulbright Distinguished Chair in Advanced Science and Technology (DST)
- Fellow of the American Association for the Advancement of Science (2011)
- "Breakthrough of the year 2010", Science magazine
- "Top Ten Discoveries of 2010", Physics World (IOP)
- "Top Ten Discoveries of 2011", Physics World (IOP)
- Fellow of the American Physical Society (2009)
