= Richard E. Cellon =

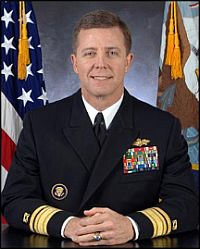
- Rear Admiral Richard Cellon
- Military career
- Allegiance: United States of America
- Branch: United States Navy
- Service years: 1974 - Present
- Rank: Rear Admiral
- Commands: 1st Naval Construction Division
- Conflicts: Gulf War
- Awards: Defense Superior Service Medal; Legion of Merit

Richard E. Cellon is a Rear Admiral in the U.S. Navy in command of the 1st Naval Construction Division.

Prior to his current position, he commanded the Naval Facilities Engineering facility in Pearl Harbor. He also led the Naval Mobile Construction Battalion.

== Education ==
- Bachelor's degree from the US Naval Academy
- Master's degree from the University of Florida (civil engineering)
- Master's degree from the Naval War College (national security and strategic studies)
- Post-graduate degree work at the University of Pennsylvania

== See also ==
Media related to Richard Cellon at Wikimedia Commons
