= Kris Paronto =

American author, businessman, soldier, and contractor

Kristian Joaquin Paronto
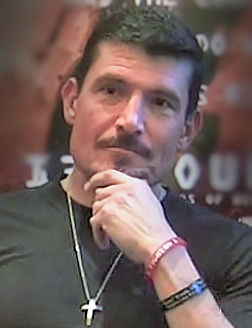
- Paronto in 2016
- Born: Kristian Joaquin Paronto; March 2, 1971 (age 55); Alamosa, Colorado, U.S.
- Education: Dixie College A.S., Mesa State College (B.S.); University of Nebraska at Omaha (graduate)
- Occupations: Author, businessman
- Military career
- Allegiance: United States
- Branch: US Army; Central Intelligence Agency
- Service years: 1995–2003 (Army); 2003–2013 (CIA)
- Rank: Sergeant (Army)
- Unit: 2nd Ranger Battalion
- Conflicts: 2012 Benghazi attack
- Writing career
- Period: 2012–present
- Notable works: 13 Hours: The Inside Account of What Really Happened In Benghazi; The Ranger Way: Living the Code On and Off the Battlefield

Kristian Joaquin "Tanto" Paronto (born 2 March 1971) is an American author, businessman, and former Army Ranger and CIA security contractor. He is known for his actions while part of the CIA annex security team during the 2012 terrorist attack on the U.S. Ambassador to Libya, J. Chris Stevens and the CIA compound in Benghazi. He is featured in the book 13 Hours: The Inside Account of What Really Happened in Benghazi and is credited as a co-author, and is author of the self-help books The Patriot's Creed: Inspiration and Advice for Living a Heroic Life and The Ranger Way: Living the Code On and Off the Battlefield.

Paronto was portrayed by actor Pablo Schreiber in the film 13 Hours: The Secret Soldiers of Benghazi.

== Early life and education ==
Paronto was born in Alamosa, Colorado. His parents were educators and his mother taught his first-grade class. His father James Paronto was a football coach and athletic director. Paronto played football, baseball and basketball. A football scholarship helped pay for his college degrees which include an associates, bachelor's and master's degrees.

== Military career ==
Paronto served four years as an Army Ranger followed by four years in the Army National Guard. He reached the enlisted rank of sergeant before receiving a commission in 2003.

== Benghazi attack ==
Paronto was a CIA Global Response Staff (GRS) contractor guarding the Benghazi, Libya CIA annex, during the 2012 Benghazi attack. CIA contractors Tyrone S. Woods and Glen Doherty were killed in the attack along with the U.S. Ambassador to Libya J. Christopher Stevens and U.S. Foreign Service Information Management Specialist Sean Smith. After Benghazi, Paronto served as a security contractor in Yemen before leaving the CIA.

== Writing and Speaking career ==
Following his exit from the CIA, Paronto became an author and public speaker. After the U.S. captured Ahmed Abu Khatallah for his role in the Benghazi attack and brought him to the U.S., Paronto was critical of the decision made by the Obama administration to have him tried before a jury in Federal court. In protest of that decision, Paronto refused to testify at his trial. Along with Mitchell Zuckoff and other members of the Annex Security Team stationed in Benghazi, Paronto co-wrote the book 13 Hours: The Inside Account of What Really Happened In Benghazi. The book was the basis for the Michael Bay-directed film 13 Hours: The Secret Soldiers of Benghazi.

In 2017, Paronto released his second book, The Ranger Way: Living the Code On and Off the Battlefield, a self-help book and survival guide based on Paronto's military experiences.

== Other media ==
Paronto hosted the pilot episode of War Heroes, a documentary series about American military personnel, produced by Fox Trail Productions.

In 2017 Paronto starred in the music video for the song "Madness" by the metalcore band All That Remains.

In November 2019, Paronto launched Battleline Podcast with Ian Scotto which has continued since.

== Charitable work ==
Paronto is co-founder of the 14th Hour Foundation, a non-profit organization "committed to raising and dispersing funds to help the lives and futures of Veterans, Military Contractor Personnel, and First Responders who have served and sacrificed to protect the American Homeland."

Paronto is the owner and lead instructor of Battleline Tactical.

== Bibliography ==
- The Patriot's Creed: Inspiration and Advice for Living a Heroic Life
- The Ranger Way: Living the Code On and Off the Battlefield, ISBN 1478948205, ISBN 1478948183, 2017
- 13 Hours: The Inside Account of What Really Happened In Benghazi, ISBN 1455582271, 2014
