= 13 Hours: The Secret Soldiers of Benghazi =

2016 film by Michael Bay

- Theatrical release poster
- Directed by: Michael Bay
- Screenplay by: Chuck Hogan
- Based on: 13 Hours by Mitchell Zuckoff
- Produced by: Michael Bay; Erwin Stoff
- Starring: James Badge Dale; John Krasinski; Max Martini
- Cinematography: Dion Beebe
- Edited by: Pietro Scalia; Michael McCusker; Calvin Wimmer
- Music by: Lorne Balfe
- Production companies: 3 Arts Entertainment; Bay Films
- Distributed by: Paramount Pictures
- Release dates: January 12, 2016 (AT&T Stadium); January 15, 2016 (United States)
- Running time: 144 minutes
- Country: United States
- Language: English
- Budget: $50 million
- Box office: $69.4 million

13 Hours: The Secret Soldiers of Benghazi is a 2016 American biographical action-thriller film, directed and produced by Michael Bay. Written by Chuck Hogan, it is based on the 2014 non-fiction book 13 Hours by American author Mitchell Zuckoff. The film follows six members of the Annex Security Team who fought to defend the American diplomatic compound in Benghazi, Libya after waves of attacks by militants on September 11, 2012. The film stars James Badge Dale, John Krasinski, Pablo Schreiber, Max Martini, David Denman and Dominic Fumusa, with supporting roles by Toby Stephens, Alexia Barlier and David Costabile. Filming on location began on April 27, 2015, in both Malta and Morocco. Libya could not be used due to the ongoing conflict when filming began. Instead, the entire Compound and Outpost were recreated.

Upon its release on January 15, 2016, by Paramount Pictures, 13 Hours grossed over $69 million worldwide against a production budget of $50 million, becoming one of Bay's lowest-grossing films. It also received mixed reviews from critics, who praised its performances, action sequences, and dark tone, but criticized the script for historical liberties. Bay's direction also received a mixed response, with many criticizing his emphasis on over-the-top action, but some also noting it as one of his most mature and grounded films. 13 Hours received an Oscar nomination for Best Sound Mixing at the 89th Academy Awards.

== Plot ==
In 2012, following the overthrow of Libyan leader Muammar Gaddafi, Benghazi is named one of the most dangerous places in the world. While several countries have pulled their embassies out of Libya in fear of an attack by militants, the U.S. still has a diplomatic compound open in the city. Less than a mile away is a CIA outpost called the Annex, which is protected by a team of private military contractors from Global Response Staff (GRS).

New to the detail is Jack Silva, who arrives in Benghazi and is picked up by Tyrone "Rone" Woods, commander of the GRS team and a personal friend of his. Arriving at the Annex, he is introduced to the rest of the GRS team and the CIA Chief-of-Station, who constantly reminds them never to engage the citizens.

The U.S. Ambassador Stevens arrives in Benghazi to maintain diplomatic connections amidst the political and social chaos. Despite warnings, he decides to stay at the Special Mission with limited protection from a pair of Diplomatic Security (DS) agents, Wickland and Ubben, and guards hired from the local February 17th Martyrs Brigade militia, nicknamed "17-Feb".

On the morning of the eleventh anniversary of the September 11 attacks, Stevens notices suspicious men taking pictures of the compound and notifies his security detail. Back at the Annex, Silva finds out that his wife is pregnant. That night, a group of militants from Ansar al-Sharia assault the compound. The 17-Feb guards quickly surrender their posts, allowing the attackers easy access to the Special Mission compound.

Wickland takes Stevens and Smith, an IT specialist, into the safe room. Unable to breach it, the attackers set the building on fire, hoping to burn them out. Wickland escapes but loses both Stevens and Smith. At the Annex, the GRS team desperately wants to go to the compound to help, but the Chief refuses, fearing that the team's departure would leave the Annex vulnerable.

However, the team is dispatched to the compound and meets with the DS agents. Silva and Woods go into the building to search for Stevens and Smith, but only find Smith's body. The DS team retreats to the Annex, but after Wickland goes in the wrong direction, they are followed back to the Annex. Later, the GRS team also retreats to the Annex.

Knowing an attack by the militants is imminent, the CIA staff of the Annex makes several desperate calls for help. The only help they can get is from Doherty, a GRS officer in Tripoli, who forms a team including two Delta operators that fly to Benghazi after several delays. Meanwhile, the GRS team fends off the militants as they try to breach the Annex perimeter. After repelling the largest attack wave, they receive word from ISR that help is en route.

The Tripoli GRS reinforcements arrive, preparing the CIA and DS staff to head for the airport. The militants launch a mortar attack in which Ubben and Geist are wounded; Geist's left arm is partially severed, and Ubben's right leg suffers a compound fracture. Woods and Doherty are both killed by mortar.

With the GRS team compromised and the Annex now vulnerable, the remaining GRS operators watch as a convoy of vehicles rolls toward them. Fearing the worst, the operators prepare to make a final stand, until it is revealed that the convoy is part of the Libya Shield Force militia escorting the GRS reinforcements. They also discover Stevens was found behind the compound, but was pronounced dead at the hospital.

At the airport, the CIA staff and the wounded Geist board the plane to Tripoli while the remainder of the GRS team awaits the next plane with the bodies of Stevens, Smith, Woods, and Doherty. Closing titles reveal that all of the surviving Annex security team members received contractor medals in a private ceremony and have since retired from the GRS team and live with their families.

== Cast ==
=== GRS Team ===
- John Krasinski as Jack Silva, newest member of the team and former US Navy SEAL
- James Badge Dale as Tyrone S. "Rone" Woods, commander of the GRS team and former US Navy SEAL
- Max Martini as Mark "Oz" Geist, team member and retired US Marine
- Dominic Fumusa as John "Tig" Tiegen, team member and retired US Marine
- Pablo Schreiber as Kris "Tanto" Paronto, team member and former US Army Ranger
- David Denman as Dave "Boon" Benton, team member and retired US Marine Scout Sniper
- Toby Stephens as Glen "Bub" Doherty, GRS operator in Bakool, former US Navy SEAL, and good friend of Woods and Silva

=== CIA ===
- Alexia Barlier as Sona Jillani, an undercover CIA Officer in Libya
- Freddie Stroma as Brit Vayner, an undercover CIA Officer in Libya
- David Costabile as "Bob" aka "The Chief", Benghazi CIA Chief-of-Station
- Shane Rowe as CIA Annex Cook, who participates in the defense of the Annex
- Gábor Bodis as CIA Agent, a security officer

=== U.S. State Department ===
- Matt Letscher as J. Christopher Stevens, USA Ambassador to Libya
- David Giuntoli as Scott Wickland, DSS Agent
- Demetrius Grosse as Dave Ubben, DSS Agent
- David Furr as Alec Henderson, DSS Agent
- Davide Tucci as Defense Attaché
- Christopher Dingli as Sean Smith, an IT specialist

=== Civilians ===
- Wrenn Schmidt as Becky Silva, wife of Jack Silva
- Peyman Moaadi as Amahl, a local interpreter

== Production ==
=== Development ===
On February 10, 2014, it was announced that Paramount Pictures was in talks with 3 Arts Entertainment to acquire the film rights to the book 13 Hours, written by Mitchell Zuckoff, with Erwin Stoff to produce. Chuck Hogan was set to adapt the book, based on the true events of The Benghazi Attack by militants on the American diplomatic compound in Benghazi Libya, on the evening of September 11, 2012. The film would focus on six members of a security team that fought to defend the Americans stationed there. On October 29, 2014, Michael Bay was set to direct and produce the thriller.

=== Casting ===
On January 14, 2015, John Krasinski was cast to play a leading role, playing a former US Navy SEAL. On February 3, Pablo Schreiber also signed on to star in the film, playing Kris "Tanto" Paronto, one of the six-man security team. On February 6, James Badge Dale was set to star, as the leader of the security team. Max Martini was cast as another member of the security team on February 17, 2015. David Denman signed on to star in the film on March 3, 2015, playing Boon, an elite sniper. On March 5, 2015, THR reported that Dominic Fumusa also signed on, to play John "Tig" Tiegen, one of the members of the security team, who is also a former Marine with weapons expertise. Freddie Stroma was added to the cast on March 17, 2015, to play the role of an undercover CIA officer in Libya. On May 7, 2015, Toby Stephens was set to play Glen "Bub" Doherty, another of the security team members.

== Release ==
On June 30, 2015, Paramount announced that the new title would be 13 Hours: The Secret Soldiers of Benghazi, and set the film to be released on January 15, 2016, on the MLK Holiday weekend. The film premiered on January 12, 2016, at AT&T Stadium in Arlington, Texas, benefiting the Shadow Warriors Project, which supports private military security personnel and other groups.

Unusual for a major American film, the film was given only a limited release in Canada during its American wide opening weekend, playing in select theatres in six cities. The film expanded to a wide release in Canadian theatres the following weekend, January 22–24.

Paramount specifically marketed the film to conservatives, in a method similar to previous films Lone Survivor and American Sniper, both of which had beaten box office expectations. This included screening 13 Hours for key Republican Party figures in order to generate endorsement quotations.

=== Home media ===
13 Hours: The Secret Soldiers of Benghazi was released on DVD and Blu-ray on June 7, 2016. Likely due to a boost from the 2016 U.S. Presidential Election, the film made $40 million in DVD and Blu-ray sales by August 2016. It was released on 4K UHD Blu-Ray on June 11, 2019.

== Reception ==
=== Box office ===
13 Hours grossed $52.8 million in North America and $16.6 million in other territories for a worldwide total of $69.4 million, against a production budget of $50 million, making it Michael Bay's second lowest-grossing directorial film after Ambulance.

The film was projected to earn around $20 million in its four-day Martin Luther King weekend debut. It faced competition from fellow newcomer Ride Along 2, as well as holdovers The Revenant and Star Wars: The Force Awakens. Other films in a similar vein that had opened on the MLK weekend in previous years, American Sniper ($107.2 million in 2015) and Lone Survivor ($37.8 million in 2014), found success, although they had faced weaker competition, and were considered less politically divisive. However, The Hollywood Reporter noted that the film could outperform expectations if it was buoyed by waves of patriotism. The film made $900,000 from 1,995 theaters during its Thursday previews and $16.2 million in its opening weekend, finishing fourth at the box office. The film added 528 theaters in its second weekend and grossed $9 million, a 39.8% drop.

=== Critical response ===
13 Hours received mixed reviews from critics, though some viewed it as a welcomed tame effort from Michael Bay. On review aggregator Rotten Tomatoes, the film has an approval rating of 52% based on 223 reviews, with an average rating of 5.60/10. The site's consensus reads, "13 Hours: The Secret Soldiers of Benghazi is a comparatively mature and restrained effort from Michael Bay, albeit one that can't quite boast the impact its fact-based story deserves." On Metacritic the film has a score of 48 out of 100, based on 36 critics, indicating "mixed or average" reviews. Audiences polled by CinemaScore gave the film an average grade of "A" on an A+ to F scale.

Soren Andersen, writing for The Seattle Times, gave the film 3 stars out of 4, criticizing the lack of distinctive characters but ultimately summarizing 13 Hours as "engrossing" and "a ground-level depiction of heroism in the midst of the fog of war". Richard Roeper similarly praised 13 Hours in his review for the Chicago Sun-Times. Although he lamented the script, Roeper found the film to be a "solid action thriller with well-choreographed battle sequences and strong work from the ensemble cast". Like Roeper's review, New York Daily News' Joe Dziemianowicz was less receptive toward the script, but applauded the film's focus on the real-life attack, summarizing: "War is gritty here, not glamorous... [Michael Bay] delivers a gripping, harrowing, and heartfelt film."

In a mixed review, Inkoo Kang of TheWrap praised 13 Hours for its action scenes, but panned Bay's direction as "myopic". She writes, "13 Hours is the rare Michael Bay movie that wasn't made with teenage boys in mind. But that doesn't make his latest any less callously juvenile." Lindsey Bahr of the Associated Press was critical of the film's direction and cinematography, and found the screenplay to be confusing. Similarly, The Economist described the film as "a sleek, poorly scripted and largely meaningless film".

=== Libyan response ===
The film caused controversy in Libya. According to The Guardian, a Libyan social media post claimed it ignored the contributions of local people who attempted to save the US ambassador. Libya's Foreign Ministry spokesman, Salah Belnaba, denounced the film's portrayal of the Libyan people and described it as "fanatical and ignorant." Culture and Information Minister, Omar Gawaari, also criticized the film saying: "the movie shows the US contractors who actually failed to secure the ambassador [...] as heroes", adding that Michael Bay "turned America's failure to protect its own citizens in a fragile state into a typical action movie all about American heroism".

=== Accolades ===
At the 89th Academy Awards, 13 Hours received a nomination for Best Sound Mixing. However, Greg P. Russell (one of the four nominees from the film) had his nomination rescinded when it was discovered that he had contacted voters for the award by telephone in violation of campaigning regulations.

== Historical accuracy ==
The film's historical accuracy has been disputed. In the film's most controversial scene, the CIA chief in Benghazi (identified only as "Bob") tells the military contractors there when they seek permission to go defend the embassy to "stand down" and thus denies them permission. The real-life CIA chief stated that there was no stand-down order. National Review commentator David French argues that "There is much less evidence of a stand-down order from Washington or of such an order in Tripoli — at least one that would have prevented American help from arising on a timely basis. But it would be odd indeed if Washington was immediately micro-managing the emerging and confusing firefight in Benghazi."

Kris "Tanto" Paronto, a CIA contractor who was involved in action during the event, said, "We were told to 'stand down'. Those words were used verbatim—100 percent. If the truth of it affects someone's political career? Well, I'm sorry. It happens." The CIA base chief portrayed in the film has directly contradicted Paronto's claims, saying "There never was a stand-down order.... At no time did I ever second-guess that the team would depart."

Also disputed is the film's portrayal that air support was denied. A House Armed Services Committee report found that air support was unavailable or that it would have arrived too late to make a difference.

== See also ==
- Counterterrorism Center
- List of films featuring the United States Navy SEALs
