= The Ranger Way =

2017 book by Kris Paronto

The Ranger Way: Living the Code On and Off the Battlefield
- First edition
- Author: Kris Paronto
- Genre: Self-improvement
- Publisher: Center Street
- Publication date: June 1, 2017
- Publication place: United States
- Media type: Print (hardcover)
- Pages: 256
- ISBN: 978-1-4789-4818-6

The Ranger Way: Living the Code On and Off the Battlefield is a book by former Army Ranger Kris Paronto that was published in 2017. In the book Paranto explains to the readers how to bring "discipline, motivation, success and peace to life".
