= American fatalities and injuries of the 2012 Benghazi attack =

Coordinates: 32°03′40.8″N 20°04′51.3″E

Four Americans died in the 2012 Benghazi attack: Ambassador Chris Stevens, Information Officer Sean Smith, and two CIA operatives, Glen Doherty and Tyrone Woods, both former Navy SEALs. Stevens is the first U.S. ambassador killed in an attack since Adolph Dubs was killed in 1979. Senior intelligence officials later acknowledged that Woods and Doherty were contracted by the Central Intelligence Agency, not the State Department as previously identified, and were part of Global Response Staff (GRS), a team that provides security to CIA case officers and countersurveillance and surveillance protection.

Initial reports indicated that ten Libyan guards died; this was later retracted and it was reported that seven Libyans were injured. An early report indicated that three Americans were injured in the attack and treated at an American military hospital in Germany.

Since then, reports differ regarding the number of Americans wounded in the attacks. The ARB report released December 20, 2012, stated that two Americans were wounded. In March 2013 it was reported that the State Department said there were four injured Americans. In August 2013, CNN reported that seven Americans were wounded, some seriously.

Members of U.S. diplomatic mission who died in Benghazi, Libya
J. Christopher Stevens	Sean Smith (diplomat)		
J. Christopher Stevens, U.S. Ambassador to Libya	Sean Smith, U.S. Foreign Service; Information Management Officer	Glen Doherty (see below)	Tyrone S. Woods (see below)

== Glen Doherty ==
Glen Anthony "Bub" Doherty (July 10, 1970 – September 12, 2012) of Encinitas, California, was a native of Winchester, Massachusetts, and a 1988 graduate of Winchester High School.

Doherty was the second of three children born to Bernard and Barbara Doherty. He trained as a pilot at Embry–Riddle Aeronautical University before moving to Snowbird, Utah for several winters and then joining the United States Navy in 1995. Doherty served as a Navy SEAL sniper and Corpsman, responded to the bombing of USS Cole and had tours of duty in Iraq and Afghanistan. He left the navy in 2005 as a petty officer first class and joined the CIA. After leaving the navy, he worked for a private security company in Afghanistan, Iraq, Israel, Kenya and Libya. He was centrally involved in the rescue of PFC Jessica Lynch from Iraqi forces in 2003 and the rescue of Captain Richard Phillips from Somali pirates in 2009. In the month prior to the attack, Doherty as a contractor with the State Department, told ABC News in an interview that he personally went into the field in Libya to track down MANPADS, shoulder-fired surface-to-air missiles, and destroy them.

A Roman Catholic, Doherty was a member of the advisory board of the Military Religious Freedom Foundation, an organization that opposes proselytizing by religious groups in the United States military. He also co-wrote the book The 21st Century Sniper.

Doherty's funeral Mass was held at Saint Eulalia's parish in his native Winchester on September 19, 2012. His celebration of life was held in Encinitas, California, during the weekend of October 12–14, 2012.

Doherty was portrayed by actor Toby Stephens in the 2016 film 13 Hours: The Secret Soldiers of Benghazi.

== Tyrone S. Woods ==
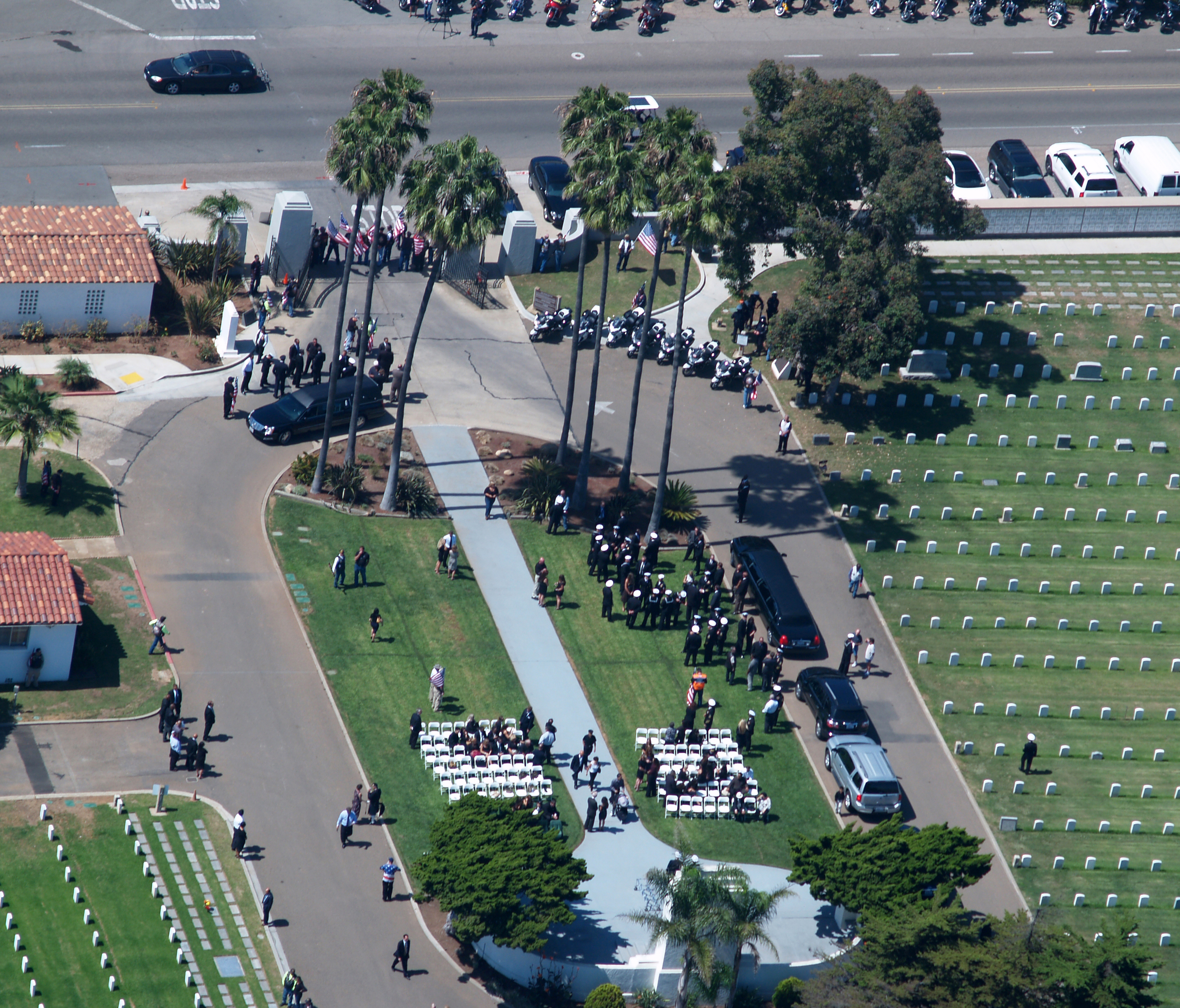
Funeral services for Woods at Fort Rosecrans Cemetery in San Diego, California, September 20, 2012

Tyrone Snowden "Rone" Woods Sr. (January 15, 1971 – September 12, 2012), of Imperial Beach, California, was born in Portland, Oregon. Woods graduated from Oregon City High School in 1989, south of Portland, Oregon, and served 21 years in the U.S. Navy SEALs before joining the Global Response Staff of the CIA. Since 2010, Woods had protected American diplomats in posts from Central America to the Middle East. In November 2012, senior U.S. intelligence officials said that Woods and Doherty were actually CIA contractors, not State Department security officers as had been previously reported, and that the two men, together with other CIA security officers, played a pivotal role in defending the besieged US Special Mission in Benghazi.

As a Navy SEAL in 2005–06, Woods was awarded the Bronze Star Medal with Combat "V" for valor in Iraq. He led 12 direct action raids and 10 reconnaissance missions leading to the capture of 34 enemy insurgents in the volatile Al Anbar province. He served multiple tours in Iraq and Afghanistan, the Middle East and Central America. He retired as a senior chief petty officer in 2010.

Woods also served with distinction at the Naval Medical Center San Diego as a registered nurse and certified paramedic. Having settled in Imperial Beach, California, for a year of his retirement he owned The Salty Frog bar there; he is survived by his second wife, Dr. Dorothy Narvaez-Woods, their one child, and two sons from a previous marriage. Woods was buried at Fort Rosecrans National Cemetery.

Woods was portrayed by actor James Badge Dale in the 2016 film 13 Hours: The Secret Soldiers of Benghazi.
