= International response to Innocence of Muslims protests =

Following the 2012 diplomatic missions attacks that began on September 11, 2012, many nations and public officials released statements. Widespread early news coverage said that the protests were a spontaneous response to an online preview of Innocence of Muslims, a movie considered offensive to Muslims due to its portrayal of the Islamic prophet Muhammad. Later consideration of the Libya attack's complexity, of statements made by some Libyan officials, and of the potentially symbolic date (the anniversary of the September 11 attacks) fueled speculation of preplanned efforts. U.S. missions in Cairo, Egypt, and Benghazi, Libya, were attacked during the first day of the protest.

== Egypt ==
Egyptian Prime Minister Hisham Kandil condemned violence, saying: "What happened at the U.S. embassy in Cairo is regrettable and [is] rejected by all Egyptian people and cannot be justified, especially if we consider that the people that produced this low film have no relation to the U.S. government. We ask the American government to take a firm position towards this film's producers within the framework of international charters that criminalise acts that stir strife on the basis of race, color or religion." Egyptian President Mohamed Morsi issued a statement 24 hours after the event, saying: "The presidency deplores the most vicious attempt to insult the person of Muhammad and condemns people who produced this extremist film" and asked President Obama to "act against the film". It added that the President had instructed Egyptian Embassy in the U.S. to "take possible legal action to respond to those persons who seek to sabotage the relations and dialogue between peoples and nations."

The site Onislam, which is affiliated with Al Azhar, issued a fatwa condemning the violence. Al Azhar itself issued a fatwa condemning the violence.

The initial reactions of President Morsi and the Muslim Brotherhood were received coldly in the US. Both American media, policy experts and President Obama contrasted the allegedly insufficient and "mild" Egyptian reaction with the Libyan reaction, which they praised. Martin S. Indyk, a former U.S. ambassador to Egypt, criticized the "precious little" that Egyptian police did "the fourth time an embassy was assaulted in Cairo," while others criticized that the Morsi's 24-hour wait before his allegedly "mild" initial rebuke of the embassy attack, which allegedly seemed to focus more on condemnation of film. In an interview, Obama remarked that though Egypt was not hostile, it was not "necessarily an ally," though the administration later backed off from this statement. In a late-night phone call, Obama warned Morsi that relations could be jeopardized if Egypt failed to protect diplomats. Two days after, a particular Arabic release by the Brotherhood saying "Egyptians rise up to support Muhammad in front of the American Embassy. Sept. 11," was attacked by the U.S. embassy in a statement.

Responding to this criticism, both Morsi and the Brotherhood took a much harder line against the embassy attacks, promising charges against those who scaled the embassy's walls, offering condolences for Stevens' death, and appearing on Egyptian television, telling Egyptians of their "religious duty to protect our guests and those who come to us from outside our nation ... I know that the people attacking the embassies do not represent any of us." Meanwhile, one Muslim Brotherhood spokesman defended its rhetoric, saying they balanced anger at the film with urging restraint, while its strategist, Khairat el-Shater wrote a letter to the NY Times, explaining that "Despite our resentment of the continued appearance of productions like the anti-Muslim film that led to the current violence, we do not hold the American government or its citizens responsible for acts of the few that abuse the laws protecting freedom of expression."

== Libya ==
Libyan Prime Minister Mustafa Abushagur's office condemned the attack and extended condolences, saying: "While strongly condemning any attempt to abuse the person of Muhammad, or an insult to our holy places and prejudice against the faith, we reject and strongly condemn the use of force to terrorise innocent people and the killing of innocent people." It also reaffirmed "the depth of relationship between the peoples of Libya and the U.S., which grew closer with the positions taken by the U.S. government in support of the revolution of February 17." Mohamed Yousef el-Magariaf, the President of the General National Congress of Libya, said: "We apologise to the United States, the people and to the whole world for what happened. We confirm that no-one will escape from punishment and questioning." He also said "we expect the world to cooperate with us to confront to what is meant out of this kind of act of cowardice."

Libyans held demonstrations in Benghazi and Tripoli on September 12, condemning the violence and holding signs such as, "Chris Stevens was a friend to all Libyans", and apologizing to Americans for the actions in their name and in the name of Muslims. The New York Times noted that young Libyans had also flooded Twitter with pro-American messages after the attacks.

It has been noted that Libyans are typically more positively inclined towards the US than their neighbors. A 2012 Gallup poll noted that "A majority of Libyans (54%) surveyed in March and April 2012 approve of the leadership of the U.S. -- among the highest approval Gallup has ever recorded in the ... region, outside of Israel." Another poll in Eastern Libya, taken in 2011, reported that the population was at the same time both deeply religious conservative Muslims and very pro-American, with 90% of respondents reporting favorable views of the US.

Ali Aujali, the ambassador to the U.S., praised Stevens as a "dear friend" and a "real hero" at a reception in Washington alongside Hillary Clinton. He also urged the U.S. to continue supporting Libya this "very difficult time" and that the young Libyan government needed help so that it could "maintain ... security and stability in our country." The Libyan response to the crisis was praised and appreciated in the U.S., with U.S. President Barack Obama emphasising how the Libyans "helped our diplomats to safety" the following day. A New York Times editorial criticised Egypt's government for not doing "what Libyan leaders did."

The Islamic institution of Dar al-Ifta' al-Libiyya, headed by Libya's Grand Mufti Al-Sadiq al-Ghiryani, issued a statement strongly condemning the attacks on the US diplomats and Libyan forces, citing a hadith by the Islamic prophet Muhammad, "Whoever killed a Mu'ahid (a person who is granted the pledge of protection by the Muslims) shall not smell the fragrance of Paradise though its fragrance can be smelt at a distance of forty years (of traveling)".

== Yemen ==
Yemeni President Abd Rabbuh Mansur Al-Hadi reacted to the attack in Sana'a and extended his apologies to the U.S., according to a statement released by the Yemeni Embassy in Washington, D.C. The statement added that the President instructed officials to "conduct an expeditious and thorough investigation into today's events" and confirmed that the perpetrators "will be prosecuted to the full extent of the law."

== United States ==
=== Government ===
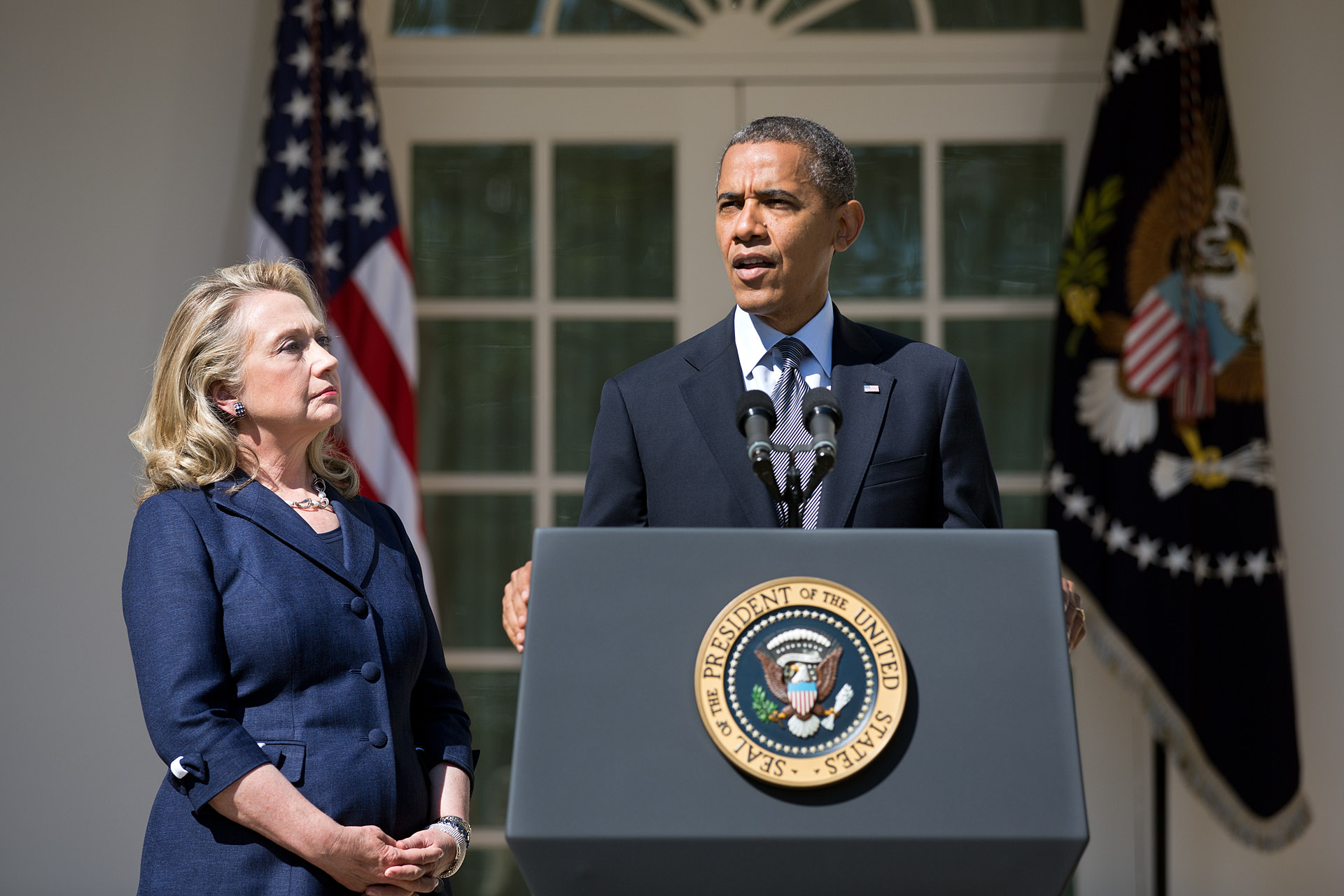
President Barack Obama, with Secretary of State Hillary Rodham Clinton, delivering a statement at the White House on September 12, 2012 in which he condemned the attack on the U.S. Mission

U.S. President Barack Obama said that he "strongly condemned this outrageous attack" on U.S. diplomatic facilities. He further ordered that security be increased at all such facilities. Obama stated with respect to the death of four diplomats in Benghazi: "Today we mourn four more Americans who represent the very best of the United States of America. We will not waver in our commitment to see that justice is done for this terrible act. And make no mistake, justice will be done." A Marine FAST team was sent to Libya to help with security.

U.S. Secretary of State Hillary Clinton said: "Some have sought to justify this vicious behavior as a response to inflammatory material posted on the internet. The United States deplores any intentional effort to denigrate the religious beliefs of others. But let me be clear: There is never any justification for violent acts of this kind." She also said: "America's commitment to religious tolerance goes back to the very beginning of our nation. But let me be clear, there is no justification for this -- none. Violence like this is no way to honor a religion or faith and as long as there are those who would take innocent life in the name of God, the world will never know a true and lasting peace." Minnesota Democrat Keith Ellison, the first Muslim elected to Congress, condemned both the film and the protests. He stated that the "amateurish and stupid" film was "deeply offensive" to "anyone who respects the faith of others", while at the same time emphasising that "the United States government had no role in creating this film. In fact, the government has condemned it and the American people have rejected it; it violates the American value of religious tolerance. Responding with violence is never justified. And those who think they are doing so in the name of Islam are wrong and ill informed." U.S. Congressmen, including Rand Paul, Tom McClintock, and Jeff Landry, asked that aid to Egypt and Libya be halted or cut. U.S. Senators John McCain, Lindsey Graham and Joe Lieberman stated: "[W]e cannot give in to the temptation to believe that our support for the democratic aspirations of people in Libya, Egypt, and elsewhere in the broader Middle East is naive or mistaken. We cannot resign ourselves to the false belief that the Arab Spring is doomed to be defined not by the desire for democracy and freedom that has inspired millions of people to peaceful action, but by the dark fanaticism of terrorists." If Americans would do this, it "would not only be a victory for the extremists and their associates, but a betrayal of everything for which Chris Stevens and his colleagues stood and gave their lives."

The Obama administration opened an investigation into whether the attack in Libya was a planned terrorist attack on the 11th anniversary of the September 11 attacks, because it was "too coordinated or professional to be spontaneous", rather than a spontaneous mob that was angry over a YouTube video criticising Islam. According to The New York Times and CNN, officials within the Obama administration have said that they believe the attack in Benghazi was deliberate, and reports indicate one or more pro-al Qaeda groups may have been involved in the attack.

The United States Navy dispatched two Arleigh Burke-class destroyers, USS McFaul and USS Laboon, to the Libyan coast. The destroyers are equipped with Tomahawk cruise missiles. American unmanned aerial vehicles were also sent to fly over Libya to search for the perpetrators of the attack. The Pentagon announced it had sent FAST Marines to Yemen to bolster U.S. embassy security there after the attack.

==== Cairo embassy statement ====
At 6:17 EST in the United States, 11 September - The embassy in Cairo released a statement:

The Embassy of the United States in Cairo condemns the continuing efforts by misguided individuals to hurt the religious feelings of Muslims – as we condemn efforts to offend believers of all religions. Today, the 11th anniversary of the September 11, 2001 terrorist attacks on the United States, Americans are honoring our patriots and those who serve our nation as the fitting response to the enemies of democracy. Respect for religious beliefs is a cornerstone of American democracy. We firmly reject the actions by those who abuse the universal right of free speech to hurt the religious beliefs of other.

At about 12:00 EST, protesters outside the Cairo embassy breach the wall and tear down U.S. flag. At about 16:00, the embassy posted a message on Twitter that read: "1) Thank you for your thoughts and prayers. 2) Of course we condemn breaches of our compound, we're the ones actually living through this. 3) Sorry, but neither breaches of our compound or angry messages will dissuade us from defending freedom of speech AND criticizing bigotry"

Domestic political controversy

Later in the day, Romney issued a statement saying: "It is disgraceful that the Obama Administration's first response was not to condemn attacks on our diplomatic missions, but to sympathize with those who waged the attacks". Republican National Committee Chairman Reince Priebus also released a statement that read: "Obama sympathizes with attackers in Egypt. Sad and pathetic"

The next day, Romney reiterated the statements: "I also believe the administration was wrong to stand by a statement sympathizing with a those who had breached our Embassy in Egypt instead of condemning their actions. The embassy in Cairo put out a statement after their grounds had been breached, protesters were inside the grounds. They reiterated that statement after the breach. I think it's a -- a terrible course for America to stand in apology for our values. ... It's their administration. Their administration spoke. The president takes responsibility not just for the words that come from his mouth but also from the words of his ambassadors, from his administration, from his embassies, from his State Department. They clearly sent mixed messages to the world. The statement that came from the administration -- and the embassy is the administration -- the statement that came from the administration was a statement which is akin to apology. And I think was a severe miscalculation." Paul Ryan echoed Romney's criticism, saying: "The administration sent mixed signals to those who attacked our embassy in Egypt and mixed signals to the world."

When directly asked about Romney's statements, Obama told 60 Minutes that Romney "seems to have a tendency to shoot first and aim later." Obama said that Romney "didn't have his facts right".

The editorial board of the Denver Post noted that Romney's critique of the embassy's statement was "out [of] line," but also stated: "This country cannot allow extremists anywhere to dictate what Americans speak, write, draw or film ... Sorry, provocative speech is not an abuse of free speech. It is precisely the speech the First Amendment exists to protect."

=== Muslim community ===
The Council on American Islamic Relations (CAIR) condemned the attack. Imam Mohamed Magid, the president of the Islamic Society of North America, an umbrella organisation of regional Muslims, condemned the violence at a news conference standing alongside a Baptist minister, a rabbi, and Ali Aujali, the Libyan ambassador to the U.S. He said: "Those who did this act of violence fall into the trap of the people who want them to act that way." Salam al-Marayati, president of the Los Angeles-based Muslim Public Affairs Council, said in a published statement that "America is our home and is home to Islam, like so many other religions. Anyone who attempts to promote the misconception that Muslims are not integrated into America is fomenting more fear and destructive behavior."

=== Domestic commentary ===
Isobel Coleman has observed that one reason for why U.S. government institutions were attacked was "a widespread problem across the Arab world: People who have lived their lives largely under dictatorship simply cannot understand how a film can be made without government sanction." Law professor Jack Balkin elaborated upon this point in an interview with The Atlantic: "Some Egyptians and Libyans think that any products of the U.S. media that make it to their countries have at least tacit U.S. government approval. A very small part of this sad mess may be a cultural translation problem." Newt Gingrich claims September 12 that the Egypt and the Libya attacks are connected. The same day, Marco Rubio speaks of "mob" attacks.

== Other international statements ==
=== Supranational bodies ===
Gulf Cooperation Council – GCC Secretary-General Abdullatif bin Rashid Al Zayani released a statement that said: "This film cannot be accepted or excused as it abuses the feelings of Muslims and non-Muslims who reject insulting prophets, religions and beliefs." The secretary-general also "condemned acts of violence against US embassies in some countries," adding that "our anger ... is no excuse to such carry out such attacks that only serve the low and suspicious aims of those who produced it."

United Nations – U.N. Secretary-General Ban Ki-moon's office released a statement that read: "The United Nations rejects defamation of religion in all forms. At the same time, nothing justifies the brutal violence which occurred in Benghazi"

European Union – In a statement, E.U. High Representative for Foreign Affairs Baroness Ashton condemned the attacks in "strongest possible terms" and urged "the Libyan authorities to work tirelessly to bring those responsible for these killings to justice."

=== Middle East and North Africa ===
Algeria – Foreign Minister Mourad Medelci offered his condolences to Hillary Clinton over the death of Ambassador Stevens. The foreign ministry also sharply criticised the movie "Innocence of Muslims".

Bahrain – The Bahraini government condemned the film and called upon the Organisation of Islamic Conference "take a strong stand against these heinous acts which fuel sedition".

Iran – President of Iran Mahmoud Ahmadinejad condemned the anti-Islam film in addition to the violence it caused, saying "We also believe that this must also be resolved in a humane atmosphere, in a participatory environment and we do not like anyone losing their lives or being killed for any reason, anywhere in the world."

Israel – Prime Minister Benjamin Netanyahu sent condolences after the attacks saying, "The people of Israel grieve with the American people, If there's any people in the world that understands what Americans are going through, what they went through in 9/11, it's the people of Israel, who've been standing at the forefront of the battle against terrorism, who've lost loved ones and who deeply, deeply sympathize with the people of America at this time," In a separate statement, Foreign Minister Avigdor Liberman condemned the attacks and said that "Israel stands by the United States in the fight for the free world and against terrorism." He added: "The rioters who attacked the American diplomatic missions are people who want to impose their views and beliefs at any price, and for them the ideals of freedom of speech and freedom of conscience are concepts that are to be removed from this world together with all Western culture."

Lebanon – Hezbollah leader Hassan Nasrallah, condemned the film and said that the spread and broadcasting of the video through the internet must be stopped and the people responsible behind these film should be punished.

Morocco – Morocco described the attacks on the U.S. consulate in Benghazi as "shameful aggression", and sent condolences to the American people. The government also denounced the anti-Islam film, adding that the attacks "cannot, in any case, be justified."

Saudi Arabia – Saudi Arabia expressed condolences to the United States for the victims of the violence and denounced the violent anti-American protests. The Kingdom also condemned the anti-Islam film. In addition, Saudi Grand Mufti, Sheikh Abdulaziz bin Abdullah Al al Sheikh, regarded attacks on foreign embassies as acts contrary to Islam.

United Arab Emirates – Foreign Minister Shaikh Abdullah Bin Zayed Al Nahyan called on the U.N. Security Council to act against the defamation of religion in order to prevent violent acts. Nahyan said: "The UAE carries a message of moderation, peace and opposition to terrorism and fundamentalism in all forms".

=== Asia ===
Afghanistan – With respect to a film mocking the Prophet Mohammed The office of President Hamid Karzai issued a statement in which it "strongly and resolutely denounces this desecrating act and declares its serious abhorrence in the face of such an insult. Prophet Mohammed ... was the greatest prophet of Islam, a prophet sent to guide mankind, a pacifist and a promoter of truth and honesty in the universe. In fact, insult to the greatest Prophet of Islam means insult to high values of 1.5 billion Muslims across the world. This offensive act has stoked interfaith enmity and confrontation and badly impacted the peaceful coexistence between human beings."

Brunei – The Prime Minister's Office released a statement condemning the film and called for Bruneian Muslims not to resort to violent protest and to stop the spread of not only the film but also matters "of similar kind" through the media.

China – Foreign Ministry spokesperson Hong Lei said that the Chinese government was "shocked" by the attacks and that it "strongly condemn[s] the violent deeds". It further reminded the Libyan government about its obligation to protect foreign ambassadors under the Vienna Convention on Diplomatic Relations.

India – Foreign Secretary Ranjan Mathai in a press release said "We are deeply shocked at the attack on the U.S. Consulate in Benghazi. India strongly condemns the violent acts which unfortunately resulted in the death of the U.S. Ambassador to Libya and other officials." The secretary has spoken to U.S. Ambassador in Delhi and conveyed condolences at the tragic loss of life.

Indonesia – President Susilo Bambang Yudhoyono said that the film was "demeaning to Islam" and called for action to stop insults to religious sensitivities.

Japan – The Ministry of Foreign Affairs said in a statement upon learning the incident in Benghazi Japan extends condolences to the victims, their families and the U.S. government and also "resolutely condemns such acts of violence". Japan also reiterated the Libyan governments responsibilities, as prescribed by international law to protect the premises of foreign mission and their members and "strongly hopes that the government will make further efforts toward the improvement of peace and order". Japan will continue to ensure the safety of their nationals abroad.

Pakistan – The Ministry of Foreign Affairs said that the Pakistani government strongly condemns the killing of Ambassador Stevens and his staff members in Benghazi. On Thursday, Pakistan tightened security for U.S. embassy in Islamabad, Consulate Generals in Peshawar, Lahore and Karachi.

Philippines - The Department of Foreign Affairs released a statement saying that the Philippines is "outraged by the horrific criminal and senseless act of violence in Benghazi which should be condemned by the international community". The statement also stresses that the attacks were a "serious violation of long standing norms of international law" and reiterated that "diplomatic and consular agents should not be harmed and that the diplomatic and consular premises are inviolable". The Philippines also extended condolences to the U.S. Ambassador, the embassy staff and their families. The Philippine National Police has stepped up additional security for American diplomatic facilities.

Singapore – The Ministry of Foreign Affairs condemns the violence in Benghazi and the anti-Islam film which incited protests around the globe. It also told said that Singapore expresses its deepest condolences to the victims and their respective families and friends. The foreign ministry spokesman also said that foreign diplomatic missions and their staffs are protected and guaranteed under the 1961 Vienna Convention on Diplomatic Relations.

Turkey – President Abdullah Gül sent a message to U.S. President Barack Obama in which he expressed his condolences and condemned the attack on the American consulate in Benghazi which killed U.S. Ambassador Stevens and four other Americans. Prime Minister Recep Tayyip Erdoğan also sent condolences to Obama in relation to the attacks. In a separate statement, Turkish Foreign Ministry also said it strongly condemns the attack and standing by American people in solidarity. It added that Turkey expects that Libyan authorities will bring those responsible in the death of the American ambassador to justice.

=== Americas ===
Argentina – President Cristina Fernández de Kirchner said that she and the Argentine people condemned the attacks, and she deeply regrets the death of Ambassador Stevens.

Bahamas – The Government of the Bahamas said it stood with its ally the United States and joined other "free and democratic" countries in condemning what it called a "cowardly" attack on the US Consulate in Benghazi. "We are shocked and dismayed by the disregard for life and this overt and violent display of intransigence by a fanatical minority towards the principles of freedom of expression and sovereignty, tenets that we hold so dear," Foreign Minister Fred Mitchell said in a statement. The Bahamian government said it reiterated its commitment to "freedom, democracy, tolerance and the prevalence of the rule of law as foundational pillars to an ordered and peaceful society." Mitchell said that diplomacy must always be the preferred option in resolving conflicts, whether the conflicts exist on a personal, national, or international level.

Brazil – The Ministry of External Relations, in a press release, stated that the Government of Brazil "vehemently repudiates" the attacks and "recalls the commitment required of all countries to uphold the inviolability principle of the premises of diplomatic and consular missions".

Canada – Foreign Affairs Minister John Baird issued a statement condemning the attack and urging "Libyan officials to ensure the extremists responsible are brought to swift justice." He also called on the Libyan government to "take all necessary measures to protect diplomatic premises in accordance with Libya's international obligations."

Chile – The government of Chile "expressed its strongest condemnation of the terrorist attack against the U.S. ambassador in Libya,". It also reiterated the country's "confidence that these events will not affect the democratization process the Libyan society is currently engaged in."

Colombia - The Ministry of Foreign Affairs of Colombia through an express statement "strongly condemns the terrorist attack" and expressed "its solidarity and condolences to the U.S. government and the families of the victims."

Cuba – Cuba condemned the attacks in Benghazi. The Foreign Ministry's statement said "violence against diplomats is not justified anywhere, or under any circumstances."

Costa Rica – Costa Rica expressed "its complete rejection" of any terrorist attacks especially those that target diplomats and said that "Costa Rica makes a vehement call for respecting international law, in particular, the obligations set out in the Vienna Conventions on Diplomatic Relations,".

El Salvador – The Salvadoran Ministry of Foreign Affairs released a statement in which it expressed its strongest condemnation of the attacks on the U.S. diplomatic missions in Libya and Egypt and called upon all states to ensure, pursuant to the Vienna Conventions on Diplomatic and Consular Relations, that all appropriate steps are taken to protect the premeses of diplomatic missions.

Guatemala – The Government of Guatemala rejected and condemned the "intolerant religious manifestation" and expressed its solidarity to the United States and the families of the victims. Guatemala urged others to "respect the inviolability of the properties of the diplomatic missions ..."

Mexico – The Secretariat of Foreign Affairs expressed its condolences on the behalf of Mexico for the violence against the U.S. representatives in Libya and Egypt, and especially for the assassination of the U.S. agent. The agency expressed its solidarity with the United States and with the families of the victims.

Panama – The Government of Panama expressed its condolences to the government and people of the United States for the deaths in Benghazi. The Panamanian Foreign Ministry strongly condemned this kind of actions, which "cause mourning and pain to a friend country," adding the diplomatic missions in the world should be protected by local authorities.

Paraguay – The Government of Paraguay called for those responsible to be brought to justice. "The [Paraguayan] Ministry of Foreign Relations, while reiterating its most forceful rejection of these acts of violence and intolerance, asks ... Libya to impose a just punishment on those responsible."

Venezuela – The Foreign Ministry condemned the attacks, saying the attacks "violated the territorial sovereignty of the United States and the immunity that protects all diplomatic missions."

=== Oceania ===
Australia – Foreign Minister Bob Carr condemned the "barbaric attack" on the United States consulate in Libya. He also called Ambassador Stevens a "friend to Australia" and noted that "Libya is a country finding its way out of the wreckage of decades of dictatorship, and struggling with the challenges of rogue militia and Gaddafi sympathisers."

Federated States of Micronesia - The Congress of the Federated States of Micronesia expressed its condolences over the attack to the United States Department of State and condemned the acts of violence.

=== Europe ===
Austria – Vice-Chancellor and Foreign Minister Michael Spindelegger was "deeply shocked" and condemned "in the strongest terms the murder of U.S. Ambassador Christopher Stevens and three other consulate employees in Bengazhi [sic]." He added that "the new Libya ... must draw a clear line here."

Belgium – Deputy Prime Minister and Foreign Minister Didier Reynders "strongly" condemned the attacks, expressed condolences to the American people and government. He "welcomes the fact that the Libyan President has condemned this attack and that he is promising the Libyan government's full support in bringing the perpetrators of this cowardly attack to justice."

Bulgaria – Foreign Minister Nickolay Mladenov condemned the attack, stating that killing "in the name of religion" is unacceptable.

France – Foreign Minister Laurent Fabius condemned the "shocking" attacks in Benghazi and extended condolences to the family and friends of the victims as well to the American people. He also told that France wants the Libyan government to shed full light on these "heinous crimes" and to take measures to ensure the protection of diplomatic missions and personnel in their territory. He finally added that despite the tragedy France "must not abandon the goal of building a democratic and free Libya."

Germany – Foreign Minister Guido Westerwelle condemned the attacks in "the strongest possible terms" and noted that "Yesterday's events in Cairo and Benghazi make abundantly clear what religious fanaticism can lead to."

Hungary – In a statement, the Ministry of Foreign Affairs of Hungary condemned the unjustifiable murderous attack, which caused the death of four American citizens who worked to support the democratic transformation in Libya. Hungary undertook to represent the interests of the United States in Libya for several months in 2011 as a protective power. Foreign Minister János Martonyi also sent a letter to U.S. Secretary of State Hillary Clinton, expressing the deepest condolences and sympathies of the Hungarian Government and the people of Hungary.

Italy – Prime Minister Mario Monti said in a news conference, "We will continue to support the government of the new democratic Libya, which we are sure will spare no effort in preventing Libya's new course from being hijacked," and added condemnation to the attacks.

Norway – Minister of foreign affairs Jonas Gahr Støre strongly condemned the attacks saying "We condemn the attack on the U.S. consulate in Benghazi and the killing of diplomats and ordinary civilians in the strongest terms. Such acts of violence are indefensible. We will raise this matter with the Libyan authorities. Under international law, the receiving state has full responsibility for the security of diplomatic and consular missions and their staff".

Romania – Foreign Minister Titus Corlăţean condemned the attack in Benghazi and sent a letter of condolences to Secretary of State Hillary Clinton on 12 September. On the same day, the Ministry of Foreign Affairs stated in a press release that "Romania requests the new Libyan authorities to urgently respond by measures to capture and bring before justice the perpetrators" of the attack, adding that "the international community must not condone such attacks against members of the diplomatic corps in the line of duty".

Russia – Foreign Minister Sergei Lavrov sent a telegram to U.S. Secretary of State Hillary Clinton, saying he was "shocked by the tragic deaths" of the ambassador and the other diplomats, and asked her to convey his country's condolences to the victims families.

Serbia - Serbian MFA had strongly condemned the attack on the US Consulate in Benghazi and the killing of Ambassador Stevens and three other US Embassy staff in Libya, welcomed the rapid response and condemnation of the attack by the Libyan authorities and expressed belief that "the leadership and people of Libya will stop extremists from preventing further democratic development of the country".

Ukraine – The Ministry of Foreign Affairs, said that Ukraine was "shocked by the attacks on the U.S. consulate in Libya" and strongly condemned the attacks. The director of the ministry's information policy department, Oleh Voloshyn said that "This awful crime, unfortunately, once again shows that the real security situation in Libya is far from what the international community tried to achieve through its actions against the country,".

UK – United Kingdom Foreign Secretary William Hague condemned the attack on the U.S. Consulate in Benghazi as "senseless and brutal" and added that the attack serves as "a reminder of the continuing need to bring law and order to all parts of Libya so that the people of Libya can have a safer, more peaceful and prosperous future." He called upon the Libyan authorities to "take urgent action to improve security, particularly in Benghazi, and identify those responsible for such attacks."

Holy See – Vatican spokesman Federico Lombardi issued a statement that read: "The serious consequences of unjustified offence and provocations against the sensibilities of Muslim believers are once again evident." He continued: "The reactions they arouse, sometimes with tragic results, which in their turn nourish tension and hatred, unleashing unacceptable violence"

=== Other groups ===
The Moro Islamic Liberation Front, an Islamist group in the southern Philippines denied Al-Qaeda calls to attack US targets over the controversial film and have urged Filipino Muslims not to resort to violence. The group is currently in ceasefire with the Philippine government and has vowed not to attack American targets in the country. "We do not live in the dark ages, there are rules and laws that need to be followed," MILF's chief political officer Ghazali Jaafar said. He described the incident in Benghazi as a "senseless act of violence." He also said that the protection of diplomats and embassies must be honored even in war, and condemned the people behind the anti-Muslim film.

== Blocking of the YouTube video ==
The video has been blocked in Egypt and Libya by YouTube. Indonesia has also blocked the video, while Afghanistan has blocked YouTube itself. It was reported that India is also planning to block the video and other similar pages.

== See also ==
- Reactions to Innocence of Muslims
- Jyllands-Posten Muhammad cartoons controversy
- 2008 Serbia protests, during which the U.S. embassy in Serbia was torched by a mob
- 2011 Mazar-i-Sharif attack
- 2011 attack on the British Embassy in Iran, a mob invasion of the British embassy
- 2011 attack on the Israeli Embassy in Egypt
- 2012 U.S. Consulate attack in Benghazi
- Arnold Lewis Raphel, the previous U.S. ambassador to die in the line of duty
- List of attacks on diplomatic missions
- Arab Spring
