= Department of State Operations and Embassy Security Authorization Act, Fiscal Year 2014 =

Bill of the 113th U.S. Congress

- Long title: To authorize appropriations for the Department of State for fiscal year 2014, and for other purposes.
- Announced in: the 113th United States Congress
- Sponsored by: Rep. Edward R. Royce (R, CA-39)
- Number of co-sponsors: 1

Codification
- Acts affected: Foreign Service Act of 1980, Omnibus Diplomatic Security and Antiterrorism Act of 1986, Foreign Relations Authorization Act, Fiscal Years 1990 and 1991, Secure Embassy Construction and Counterterrorism Act of 1999, and others.
- U.S.C. sections affected: 22 U.S.C. § 3929, 22 U.S.C. § 2710, 22 U.S.C. § 3981, 22 U.S.C. § 3943, 22 U.S.C. § 3949, and others.
- Agencies affected: United States Congress, Office of Management and Budget, United States Department of Justice, United States Department of State, International Boundary and Water Commission, NATO, United Nations, United States Department of the Treasury, Office of Personnel Management, Department of Homeland Security, United States Agency for International Development, United States Department of Defense
- Authorizations of appropriations: $17,573,992,000

Legislative history
- Introduced in the House as H.R. 2848 by Rep. Edward R. Royce (R, CA-39) on July 30, 2013; Committee consideration by United States House Committee on Foreign Affairs; Passed the House on September 29, 2013 (Roll Call Vote 500: 384-37)

The Department of State Operations and Embassy Security Authorization Act, Fiscal Year 2014 (H.R. 2848) is a bill that was introduced in the United States House of Representatives during the 113th United States Congress. The bill would authorize $17,573,992,000 to be appropriated to improve the security of U.S. Embassies throughout the world.

== The bill ==
The bill was a considered response to recent events, such as the 2012 Benghazi attack and the closing of 21 U.S. Embassies in August. In addition to authorizing improvements to embassy security, the bill also authorizes the entire United States Department of State. According to Rep. Edward R. Royce (R, CA-39), who introduced the bill, the bill would ensure "that our embassies and personnel stationed abroad are protected at a time of their greatest need." If the bill were enacted, it would be the first time in ten years that a State Department authorizations bill was passed by Congress.

== Background ==
An authorization bill, like this one, is a type of bill used by the United States Congress. It is one half of the authorization-appropriation process established by Congress to fund the federal government and its various programs. The process provides for two separate types of measures—authorization measures and appropriation measures. These bills perform different functions. Authorization acts establish, continue, or modify agencies or programs. For example, an authorization act may establish or modify programs within the Department of Defense. An authorization act may also explicitly authorize subsequent appropriations for specific agencies and programs, frequently setting spending ceilings for them. These authorization of appropriations provisions may be permanent, annual, or multiyear authorizations. Annual and multiyear provisions require reauthorizations when they expire. Congress is not required to provide appropriations for an authorized discretionary spending program. Appropriations measures provide new budget authority for programs, activities, or agencies previously authorized. The Department of State Operations and Embassy Security Authorization Act, Fiscal Year 2014 is an authorization bill. A separate appropriation bill would be required to appropriate the funding the State Department and related agencies are granted in this bill.

== Summary from the House Foreign Affairs Committee ==
This summary can be found in House Report 113-226, and was written by the United States House Committee on Foreign Affairs.

H.R. 2848, the Department of State Operations and Embassy Security Authorization Act for Fiscal Year 2014, is the signature annual legislation of the Committee on Foreign Affairs. This bill provides funding for the management and operations of the Department of State at fiscally responsible levels, while strengthening security at our diplomatic facilities overseas. Our embassies and personnel are targets for those seeking to harm the United States, and more needs to be done to ensure their safety.

Among other things, this bill advances efforts to improve the physical infrastructure at posts overseas to comply with the highest standards of protection; to increase training for those responsible for guarding our compounds and personnel; to put in place procedures that respond appropriately to threats, reducing the chances of another attack like that suffered in Benghazi, Libya; to review the policies and procedures of the Bureau of Diplomatic Security; to authorize the use of "best value" contracting at high-risk, high-threat posts; to authorize security improvements at soft targets; and to provide for security enhancements in line with Accountability Review Board recommendations.

== Congressional Budget Office report ==
This summary is based largely on the summary provided by the Congressional Budget Office, a public domain source, as ordered reported by the House Committee on Foreign Affairs on August 1, 2013.

H.R. 2848 would authorize appropriations for the Department of State. The Congressional Budget Office (CBO) estimates that implementing the bill would have discretionary costs of $14.6 billion over the 2014-2018 period, assuming appropriation of the specified and estimated amounts. The CBO estimates that enacting the bill would increase direct spending by $1 million over the 2014-2023 period and have insignificant effects on revenues; thus, pay-as-you-go procedures apply.

H.R. 2848 contains no intergovernmental mandates as defined in the Unfunded Mandates Reform Act (UMRA). The bill would impose private-sector mandates, as defined in UMRA, by extending passport surcharges that are currently set to expire and by authorizing the Secretary of State to restrict or revoke passports issued to sex offenders. The CBO estimates that the aggregate cost of mandates on private entities would total about $330 million, and thus exceed the annual threshold established in UMRA for private-sector mandates ($150 million in 2013, adjusted annually for inflation).

== Provisions ==
The bill would authorize $535 million for State Department education and cultural exchange programs, which is $28 million less than President Obama requested.

The total authorization for the State Department is 5.8 percent below what it was in fiscal year 2013.

== Procedural history ==
=== House ===
The Department of State Operations and Embassy Security Authorization Act, Fiscal Year 2014 was introduced in the House on July 30, 2013 by Rep. Edward R. Royce (R, CA-39). The bill received the broad support of both parties. It was referred to the United States House Committee on Foreign Affairs, which reported it out of committee alongside House Report 113-226. On Sunday, September 29, 2013, the House voted in Roll Call Vote 500 to pass the bill 384-37.

=== Senate ===
The Department of State Operations and Embassy Security Authorization Act, Fiscal Year 2014 was received in the Senate on September 30, 2013. At this time, it was unclear if the Senate would take up working on the bill since the Chairman of the Senate Foreign Relations Committee, Robert Menendez, had "not signaled a strong interest in moving his own State Department authorization."

== See also ==
- List of bills in the 113th United States Congress
- 2012 Benghazi attack
- United States Department of State
