= 2012 Benghazi attack =

Attack against two United States government facilities in Benghazi, Libya

- Part of the Factional violence in Libya (2011–2014)
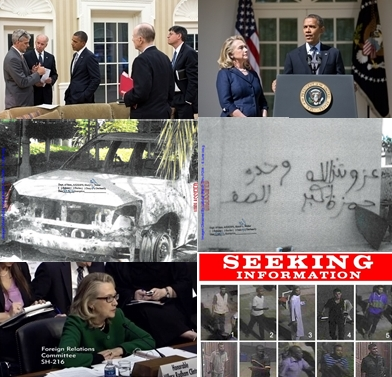
- From top to bottom, left to right: President, Vice President updated on situation night of September 11, 2012; President Obama, with Secretary Clinton, delivering statement in the Rose Garden, September 12, 2012; two photographs released through a FOIA request; Secretary Clinton testifying before the Senate Committee on January 23, 2013; portion of "wanted" poster seeking information on the attack.
- Location: Benghazi, Libya
- Date: September 11–12, 2012; 21:40 – 04:15 EET (UTC+02:00)
- Target: United States diplomatic post and CIA annex
- Attack type: Coordinated attack, armed assault, arson
- Weapons: Rocket-propelled grenades, hand grenades, assault rifles, 14.5 mm anti-aircraft machine guns, truck mounted artillery, diesel canisters, mortars
- Deaths: U.S. Ambassador J. Christopher Stevens; USFS officer Sean Smith; CIA contractors Tyrone S. Woods and Glen Doherty; unknown number of Libyan attackers
- Injuries: 3 Americans, 7 Libyans
- Perpetrators: Ansar al-Sharia; Al-Qaeda in the Islamic Maghreb (alleged)

Members of the Islamic militant group Ansar al-Sharia carried out a coordinated attack against two United States government facilities in Benghazi, Libya, on September 11, 2012. At 9:40 p.m. local time, members of Ansar al-Sharia attacked the American diplomatic compound in Benghazi resulting in the deaths of both United States ambassador to Libya J. Christopher Stevens and U.S. Foreign Service information management officer Sean Smith. At around 4:00 a.m. on September 12, the group launched a mortar attack against a CIA annex approximately one mile (1.6 km) away, killing CIA contractors Tyrone S. Woods and Glen Doherty and wounding ten others. Initial analysis by the CIA, repeated by top government officials, indicated that the attack spontaneously arose from a protest. Subsequent investigations showed that the attack was premeditated—although rioters and looters not originally part of the group may have joined in after the attacks began.

There is no definitive evidence that al-Qaeda or any other international terrorist organization participated in the Benghazi attack. The United States immediately increased security worldwide at diplomatic and military facilities and began investigating the Benghazi attack. The Libyan Government condemned the attacks and took steps to disband the militias. 30,000 Libyans marched through Benghazi condemning Ansar al-Sharia, which had been formed after the 2011 Libyan civil war which toppled Muammar Gaddafi.

Despite numerous accusations against President Obama, Hillary Clinton, and Susan Rice, ten investigations did not find that they or any other high-ranking Obama administration officials had acted improperly. Four career State Department officials were criticized for denying requests for additional security at the facility prior to the attack. Eric J. Boswell, the assistant secretary of state for diplomatic security, resigned under pressure, while three others were suspended. In her role as secretary of state, Hillary Clinton subsequently took responsibility for the security lapses.

On August 6, 2013, it was reported that the United States had filed criminal charges against several individuals alleged to have been involved in the attacks, including militia leader Ahmed Abu Khattala. Khattala has been described by both Libyan and United States officials as the Benghazi leader of Ansar al-Sharia. The United States Department of State designated Ansar al-Sharia as a terrorist organization in January 2014. Khattala was captured in Libya by United States Navy Special Operations Forces, who were acting in coordination with the Federal Bureau of Investigation (FBI), in June 2014. Another suspect, Mustafa al-Imam, was captured in October 2017. In February 2026, Zubayr al-Bakoush, who is believed to have played a central role in the attack, was captured and extradited to the United States.

== Background ==
=== American presence in Libya and Benghazi ===
The US had not had regular diplomatic presence in Libya since withdrawing its ambassador in 1972 and then closing its embassy after the 1979 U.S. embassy burning in Libya, but since the early 2000s had been starting to normalise relations. During Congressional hearings, Ambassador J. Christopher Stevens' top deputy in Libya, Gregory N. Hicks, testified that Ambassador Stevens was in Benghazi in 2012 because "Secretary [of State Hillary] Clinton wanted the post made permanent", and it was understood that the secretary hoped to make an announcement to that effect during a visit to Tripoli later in the year. He also stated that "Chris [Stevens] wanted to make a symbolic gesture to the people of Benghazi that the United States stood behind their dream of establishing a new democracy."

In 2013, CNN reported that sources told it that around 35 US personnel were working in the diplomatic mission in Benghazi at the time of the attack, of whom around 21 were CIA officers. Within months of the start of the Libyan revolution in February 2011, the CIA had begun building a covert presence in Benghazi. During the war, elite counterterrorist operators from the United States Delta Force were deployed to Libya as analysts, instructing the rebels on specifics about weapons and tactics.

J. Christopher Stevens was named the first liaison with the Libyan opposition in March 2011. After the end of the war, both the CIA and the United States' State Department were tasked with continuing to identify and collect arms that had flooded the country during the war, particularly shoulder-fired missiles taken from the arsenal of the Gaddafi regime, as well as securing Libyan chemical weapons stockpiles, and helping to train Libya's new intelligence service.

Eastern Libya and Benghazi were key intelligence-gathering hubs for intelligence operatives. Before the attack, the CIA was monitoring Ansar al-Sharia and suspected members of Al-Qaeda in the Islamic Maghreb, as well as attempting to define the leadership and loyalty of the various militias present and their interaction with the Salafi elements of Libyan society. By the time of the attack, dozens of CIA operatives were on the ground in Benghazi. In addition, it has been reported that in the summer of 2012, American Joint Special Operations Command (JSOC) missions had begun to target Libyan militias linked to the Al-Qaeda network of Yasin al-Suri. By the time of the attack, a composite U.S. Special Operations team with two JSOC members was already in Libya working on their mission profile independently of the CIA and State Department operations.

There was some speculation that the diplomatic post in Benghazi was used by the CIA to smuggle weapons from Libya to anti-Assad rebels in Syria. Investigative journalist Seymour Hersh cites an anonymous former senior Defense Department Intelligence Official, saying "The consulate's only mission was to provide cover for the moving of arms. It had no real political role." The attack allegedly brought an end to the purported United States involvement, but did not stop the smuggling according to Hersh's source.

In January 2014, the United States House Permanent Select Committee on Intelligence cast doubt on this alleged United States involvement and reported that "All CIA activities in Benghazi were legal and authorized. On-the-record testimony establishes that the CIA was not sending weapons ... from Libya to Syria, or facilitating other organizations or states that were transferring weapons from Libya to Syria."

=== Instability in Benghazi ===
In April 2012, two former security guards for the consulate threw an IED over the consulate fence; the incident did not cause any casualties. Just four days later, a similar bomb was thrown at a four-vehicle convoy carrying the United Nations Special Envoy to Libya, exploding twelve feet (3.7 m) from the United Nations envoy's vehicle without injuring anyone.

In May 2012, an al-Qaeda affiliate calling itself the "Brigades of the Imprisoned Sheikh Omar Abdul Rahman" claimed responsibility for an attack on the International Red Cross (ICRC) office in Benghazi. On August 6, the ICRC suspended operations in Benghazi. The head of the ICRC's delegation in Libya said the aid group was "appalled" by the attack and "extremely concerned" about escalating violence in Libya.

The Brigades of the Imprisoned Sheikh Omar Abdel-Rahman released a video of what it said was its detonation of an explosive device outside the gates of the U.S. consulate on June 6, which caused no casualties but blew a hole in the consulate's perimeter wall, described by one individual as "big enough for forty men to go through". The Brigades claimed that the attack was in response to the killing of Abu Yahya al Libi, a Libyan al-Qaeda leader who had just died in an American drone attack, and was also timed to coincide with the imminent arrival of a United States Diplomat. There were no injuries, but the group left behind leaflets promising more attacks against the United States.

British Ambassador to Libya Dominic Asquith survived an assassination attempt in Benghazi on June 10, 2012. Two British protection officers were injured in the attack when their convoy was hit by a rocket-propelled grenade 300 meters from their consulate office. The British Foreign Office withdrew all consular staff from Benghazi in late June 2012.

On June 18, 2012, the Tunisian Consulate in Benghazi was attacked by individuals affiliated with Ansar al-Sharia, allegedly because of "attacks by Tunisian artists against Islam".

On the day of the attack, two consulate security guards spotted a man in a Libyan police uniform taking pictures of the consulate with his cell phone from a nearby building that was under construction. The security guards briefly detained the man before releasing him. He drove away in a police car and a complaint was made to the Libyan police station. Sean Smith noticed this surveillance, and messaged a friend online around noon, "Assuming we don't die tonight. We saw one of our 'police' that guard the compound taking pictures."

According to a local security official, he and a battalion commander had met with United States Diplomats three days before the attack and warned the Americans about deteriorating security in the area. The official told CNN that he advised the diplomats, "The situation is frightening; it scares us."

Ambassador Stevens' diary, which was later found at the compound, recorded his concern about the growing al-Qaeda presence in the area and his worry about being on an al-Qaeda hit list.

United States Security Officer Eric Nordstrom twice requested additional security for the mission in Benghazi from the State Department. His requests were denied and according to Nordstrom, State Department Official Charlene Lamb wanted to keep the security presence in Benghazi "artificially low".

On December 30, 2012, the United States Senate Committee on Homeland Security and Governmental Affairs released a report, "Flashing Red: A Special Report on the Terrorist Attack at Benghazi", wherein it was determined:

In the months [between February 2011 and September 11, 2012] leading up to the attack on the Temporary Mission Facility in Benghazi, there was a large amount of evidence gathered by the U.S. Intelligence Community (IC) and from open sources that Benghazi was increasingly dangerous and unstable, and that a significant attack against American personnel there was becoming much more likely. While this intelligence was effectively shared within the Intelligence Community (IC) and with key officials at the Department of State, it did not lead to a commensurate increase in security at Benghazi nor to a decision to close the American mission there, either of which would have been more than justified by the intelligence presented. ... The RSO [Regional Security Officer] in Libya compiled a list of 234 security incidents in Libya between June 2011 and July 2012, 50 of which took place in Benghazi.

The desire of the State Department to maintain a low profile in Benghazi has been cited as the reason why the State Department circumvented their own Overseas Security Policy Board (OSPB) standards for diplomatic security. In the aftermath, Clinton sought to take responsibility for the security lapses at Benghazi and expressed personal regret. In her January 2013 testimony before Congress, Secretary Clinton claimed security decisions at the Benghazi compound had been made by others, stating, "The specific security requests pertaining to Benghazi ... were handled by the security professionals in the [State] Department. I didn't see those requests, I didn't approve them, I didn't deny them."

== Attack ==
The Benghazi attack was conducted by separate military factions on two separate United States compounds. The first assault occurred at the main diplomatic compound, approximately 300 yards (270 m) long and 100 yards (91 m) wide, at about 9:40 p.m. local time (3:40 p.m. Eastern Time). A mortar fire attack on a CIA annex 1.2 miles (1.9 km) away began at about 4:00 a.m. the following morning and lasted for 11 minutes.

=== Assault on the compound ===
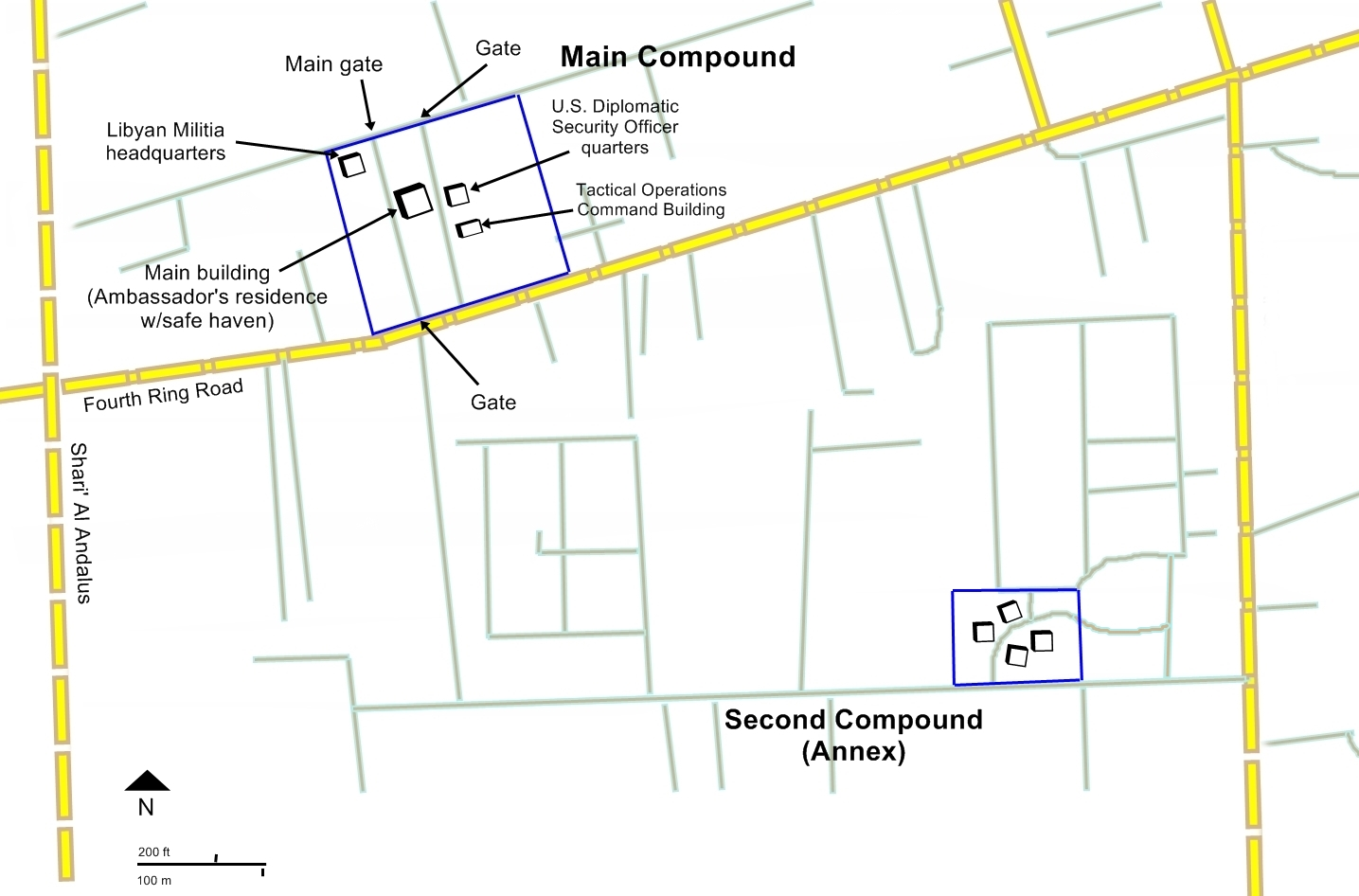
Map of the U.S. mission main compound and annex

A Libyan guard who was wounded in the attack later said "there wasn't a single ant outside [before the attack]." According to Media Matters For America, the attackers stated they were acting in response to Innocence of Muslims. No more than seven Americans were in the compound, including Ambassador Stevens.

Stevens was visiting Benghazi at the time to review plans to establish a new cultural center and modernize a hospital. The ambassador also "needed to [prepare a] report ... on the physical and the political and security environment in Benghazi to support an action memo to convert Benghazi from a temporary facility to a permanent facility". Surplus funds originally dedicated for use in Iran for fiscal year 2012 were to be redirected and obligated for use in Benghazi: an action that had to be completed before the end of the fiscal year—September 30, 2012.

Stevens had his last meeting of the day with a Turkish diplomat (Consul General Ali Sait Akın), and escorted the Turkish diplomat to the main gate at about 8:30 p.m. local time. The street outside the compound was calm, and the State Department reported no unusual activity during the day outside. Stevens retired to his room at about 9:00 p.m.

About 9:40 p.m. CAT, large numbers of armed men approached the compound from multiple directions. They then threw grenades over the wall and entered the compound with automatic weapons fire, RPGs, and heavier weapons. A Diplomatic Security Service (DSS) agent viewed on the consulate's security cameras "a large number of men, armed men, flowing into the compound". He hit the alarm and started shouting, "Attack! Attack!" over the loudspeaker. Phone calls were made to the embassy in Tripoli, the Diplomatic Security Command Center in Washington, the February 17th Martyrs Brigade and a U.S. quick reaction force located at the annex compound a little more than a mile (1.6 km) away.

Diplomatic Security Service Special Agent Scott Wickland secured Stevens and Sean Smith, an information management officer, in the main building's safe haven. The rest of the agents left to retrieve their weapons and tried to return to the main building. The attackers entered the main building and attempted to enter the safe haven. They then spread diesel fuel in the room and set fires. Stevens, Smith, and Wickland moved to the nearby bathroom, but then decided to leave the safe haven after being overcome by smoke. Wickland exited through the window, but Stevens and Smith did not follow him. Wickland (who was severely wounded by gunfire) returned several times but could not find them in the smoke; he went up to the roof and radioed other agents. Three agents returned to the main building in an armored vehicle, searched the building and found Smith's body, but not Stevens.

According to the Annex Security Team, they had become aware of the consulate attack after 9:30 p.m. CAT, and were ready to respond; however, they were delayed by "the top CIA officer in Benghazi". The Regional Security Office sounded the alarm and called to the Benghazi CIA annex and the embassy in Tripoli. After some discussion, the CIA's Global Response Staff (GRS) at the CIA annex, which included Tyrone S. Woods, decided to attempt a rescue. By 10:05 p.m., the team was briefed and loaded into their armored Toyota Land Cruisers. By this time, communicators at the CIA annex were notifying the chain of command about current developments, and a small CIA and JSOC element in Tripoli that included Glen Doherty was attempting to find a way to Benghazi.

The GRS team from the CIA annex arrived at the consulate and attempted to secure the perimeter and locate the ambassador and Sean Smith. Diplomatic security agent David Ubben located Smith, who was unconscious and later declared dead, but the team was unable to find Stevens in the smoke-filled building. The team then decided to return to the annex with the survivors and Smith's body. While en route back to the annex, the group's armored vehicle was hit by AK-47 rifle fire and hand grenades. The vehicle was able to make it to its destination with two flat tires, and the gates to the annex were closed behind them at 11:50 p.m.

The U.S. military had mobilized three separate teams to respond to the attack including EUCOM's CIF (Commander's-in-Extremis Force, a specialized direct action/hostage rescue team made up of U.S. Special Forces soldiers) from central Europe, a Marine Security Force Regiment team from Rota, Spain, and an unnamed special operations forces team which was in the US at the time. At the time, AFRICOM, which is responsible for operations in Africa, was the only combatant command which did not have its own CIF team thus having to request EUCOM's assistance. These teams were sent to Naval Air Station Sigonella in Sicily, Italy as a staging point on the night of the attack but did not deploy to Benghazi. United States officials stated the teams arrived at Sigonella after the attack was over.

=== Reaction in the United States ===
Diplomatic Security Service agents/Regional Security Officers informed their headquarters in Washington about the attack just as it was beginning at about 9:40 p.m. local time (3:40 p.m. Eastern Time [ET]). At the time, they were informed that the attack was a "terrorist attack".

However, through September 14, CIA analysts made a contradictory assessment, stating "We believe based on currently available information that the attacks in Benghazi were spontaneously inspired by the protests at the U.S. Embassy in Cairo and evolved into a direct assault against the U.S. Consulate and subsequently its annex. The crowd almost certainly was a mix of individuals from across many sectors of Libyan society. That being said, we do know that Islamic extremists with ties to al-Qa'ida participated in the attack."

By 4:30 p.m. ET, Pentagon officials had informed Defense Secretary Leon Panetta about the attack. The Pentagon ordered an unmanned aerial vehicle that was in the air conducting surveillance on militant camps to fly over Benghazi. The drone arrived at 11:10 p.m. local time (5:10 p.m. ET) and began providing a video feed to Washington. At 5:41 p.m. ET, Secretary of State Hillary Clinton telephoned CIA Director David Petraeus to coordinate. The CIA, which made up most of the U.S. government's presence in Benghazi, had a ten-member security team at its annex and the State Department believed that this team would assist the consulate in the event of an attack.

=== Assault on the CIA annex ===
Just after midnight, the CIA annex came under machine gun, rocket and mortar fire. The CIA defenders held off the attack until the morning. That same morning, Libyan government forces met up with a group of Americans, reinforcements from Tripoli including Glen Doherty, that had arrived at the Benghazi airport. The team, which included two active-duty JSOC operators and five CIA personnel, had commandeered a small jet in Tripoli by paying the pilots $30,000 and forcing them to fly to Benghazi. After being held up at the airport for a few hours, the Libyan forces and newly arrived Americans went to the CIA annex at about 5:00 a.m. to assist in transporting approximately 32 Americans at the annex back to the airport for evacuation. Minutes after they drove through the gates, the annex came under heavy fire. With a lull in the fighting, Doherty began searching for his friend, Tyrone S. Woods, and he was told he was on the roof. He found Woods on the roof with two other agents. A mortar round then hit Woods' position, fatally wounding him. As Doherty attempted to reposition and take cover, a second round fell on him, killing him. 31-year-old Diplomatic Security Service Special Agent David Ubben and 46-year-old CIA contractor Mark Geist suffered shrapnel injuries and several broken bones in the mortar attacks.

Immediately, several agents ran onto the roof to assess damage and help the wounded. At the same time, a JSOC operator was using a hand-held device displaying images from a Predator drone above, which had been sent by the DOD's US Africa Command after request. The defenders agreed to evacuate to the airport and were attacked with small arms fire along the route. The evacuation of about 30 Americans included six State Department personnel and Smith's body—they were unable to locate Ambassador Stevens at the time.

=== Recovery of Ambassador Stevens ===
Ambassador Stevens' body was found by a group of Libyans who had accessed the room through a window. They were unaware of his identity, and Abdel-Qader Fadl, a freelance photographer who was with them, told the Associated Press that Stevens was unconscious and "maybe moved his head, but only once". Ahmed Shams, a 22-year-old arts student, told the Associated Press that they were happy when they found Stevens alive and tried to rescue him. A freelance videographer, Fahd al-Bakoush, later published a video showing Libyans trying to extract the ambassador from a smoke-filled room, where he was found unconscious. According to al-Bakoush, the Libyans saw he was alive and breathing, his eyelids flickering. Though they took him to be a foreigner, no one recognized him as Stevens.

At around 1:00 a.m., Stevens was taken to the Benghazi Medical Center, a hospital controlled by the Ansar Al-Sharia militia, in a private car as there was no ambulance to carry him. There he was administered CPR for 90 minutes by Dr. Ziad Abu Zeid. According to Dr. Zeid, Stevens died from asphyxiation caused by smoke inhalation, and had no other apparent injuries. The doctor said he believed that officers from the Libyan Interior Ministry transported the body to the airport. State Department officials said they do not know who took Stevens to the hospital or transported the body to the airport and into U.S. custody.

=== Evacuation ===
The bodies were taken to Benina International Airport and flown to the capital, Tripoli, and then to Ramstein Air Base in Germany aboard a C-17 military transport aircraft. From Germany, the four bodies arrived at Andrews Air Force Base near Washington, D.C., where President Barack Obama and members of his cabinet held a ceremony in honor of those killed.

After the attack, all diplomatic staff were moved to the capital, Tripoli, with nonessential personnel to be flown out of Libya. Sensitive documents remained missing, including documents listing the names of Libyans working with the Americans, and documents relating to oil contracts.

=== Fatalities and injuries ===
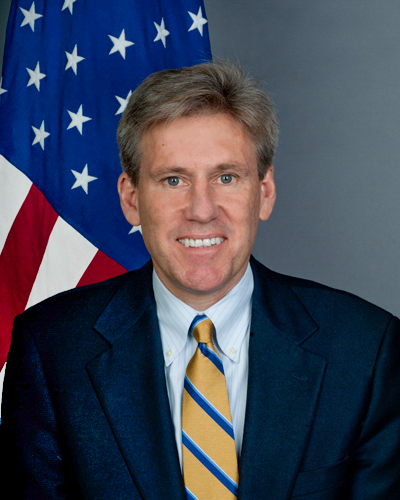
Ambassador Stevens

Four Americans died in the attack: Ambassador J. Christopher Stevens, Information Officer Sean Smith, and two CIA operatives, Glen Doherty and Tyrone S. Woods, both former Navy SEALs. Stevens was the first United States ambassador killed in an attack since Adolph Dubs was killed in Kabul, Afghanistan, in 1979.

=== Responsibility ===
On September 10, 2012, at least 18 hours before the attack in Benghazi, al-Qaeda leader Ayman al-Zawahiri released a video to coincide with the anniversary of the 9/11 attacks in 2001, which called for attacks on Americans in Libya in order to avenge the death of Abu Yahya al-Libi in a drone strike in Pakistan in June 2012. It is uncertain how much prior knowledge of the attack al-Zawahiri had, though he praised the attackers on October 12, 2012, in another video. On September 14, 2012, al-Qaeda in the Arabian Peninsula released a statement arguing the attack was revenge for the death of al-Libi, though they did not claim official responsibility for the Benghazi attack. It was later reported that 3 operatives from the group did take part in the attack. Furthermore, an intercepted phone call from the Benghazi area immediately after the attack reportedly linked senior Al-Qaeda in the Islamic Maghreb commander Mokhtar Belmokhtar to the attack.

David Kirkpatrick of The New York Times reported that 20-year-old neighbor Mohamed Bishari witnessed the attack. According to Bishari, it was launched without warning or protest and was led by the Islamist militia Ansar al-Sharia (different from the group called Ansar al-Sharia based in Yemen designated by the UN and the U.S. Department of State as a terrorist organization). Kirkpatrick reported that Ansar al-Sharia said they were launching the assault in retaliation for the release of the anti-Islamic video, Innocence of Muslims. It was further reported that Ahmed Abu Khattala was called a ringleader of the attack by both witnesses and authorities, though he insisted he did not play a part in the aggression at the American compound. Witnesses, Benghazi residents, and Western news reports have described him as a leader of Ansar al-Sharia, though he stated he was close to the group but not an official part of it. He further stated he was the commander of an Islamist brigade, Abu Obaida ibn al-Jarrah, some of whose members had joined Ansar al-Sharia.

The Brigades of the Imprisoned Sheikh Omar Abdul Rahman, a pro-al-Qaeda militia calling for the release of The Blind Sheikh, was implicated in the attack by Noman Benotman of the Quilliam Foundation. CNN, the Carnegie Endowment for International Peace, Commentary Magazine and The Daily Telegraph have listed this group as a chief suspect. USA Today reported that protests in Cairo that preceded the attack on Benghazi were intended to protest the imprisonment of Sheik Omar Abdul Rahman and announced as early as August 30. Egyptian president Mohammed Morsi had called for the release of the Blind Sheikh in his inaugural address.

In the days and weeks following the attack, President Obama and other administration officials correctly noted that the Innocence of Muslims video had sparked violent incidents at a number of U.S. diplomatic facilities, and Susan Rice stated—based on a flawed CIA assessment—that the attack "began spontaneously" after a violent protest at the American embassy in Cairo, Egypt hours earlier. During the hours before the attack, Egyptian satellite television networks popular in Benghazi had been covering the outrage over the video. In a phone call with the Egyptian prime minister Kandil the day after the attack, then-Secretary of State Hillary Clinton said "we know the attack in Libya had nothing to do with the film. It was a planned attack, not a protest." This assessment reflected information in an email sent by the State Department Operations Center to the White House, Pentagon, intelligence community and FBI at 6:07 p.m. Eastern Time the night of the attack, the subject line of which read, "Update 2: Ansar al-Sharia Claims Responsibility for Benghazi Attack." However, on the same day of the Clinton phone call, Ansar al-Sharia issued a statement saying it "didn't participate as a sole entity; rather, it was a spontaneous popular uprising in response to what happened by the West," an apparent reference to the release of the video.

However, this assessment contradicted the assessment of CIA analysts, which through September 16 maintained that "the demonstrations in Benghazi were spontaneously inspired by the protests at the U.S. Embassy in Cairo," at which violent protesters had scaled the embassy walls. And the day after the attack, Ansar al-Sharia appeared to confirm both assessments when it issued a statement saying "The [Ansar al-Shariah] Brigade didn't participate as a sole entity; rather, it was a spontaneous popular uprising in response to what happened by the West," which was an apparent reference to the Innocence of Muslims video.

A later report from an independent review board concluded "there was no protest prior to the attacks."

In a September 18 appearance on the Late Show with David Letterman, President Obama said, "extremists and terrorists used (the anti-Muslim YouTube video) as an excuse to attack a variety of our embassies." Obama spoke accurately, because five American embassies were the sites of violent protests due to the video, but Benghazi was not an embassy, it was a "diplomatic post." In his Univision Town Hall appearance on September 20, President Obama said that the "natural protests that arose because of the outrage over the video were used as an excuse by extremists to see if they can also directly harm U.S. interests." The Innocence of Muslims video triggered dozens of protests from northwest Africa to southeast Asia, including violent protests at American embassies in Tunis, Khartoum, Cairo, Sana and Jakarta.

In October 2012, a Tunisian, Ali Harzi, who a U.S. intelligence official stated had links to Ansar al-Sharia and al-Qaeda in the Maghreb, was arrested in Turkey and repatriated to Tunisia on terrorism charges and possible links to the attack on the U.S. consulate in Benghazi. Ali Harzi was released by Tunisian authorities on January 8, 2013, because of a lack of evidence.

Also in October, a Libyan suspect, Karim el-Azizi, who had recently returned to Egypt from Libya and was storing weapons in his hideout, detonated a bomb and was found dead in his apartment after clashes with security forces. He has been linked to an Egyptian terrorist group led by Muhammad Jamal Abu Ahmad, who is suspected of training some of the terrorists responsible for the Benghazi attack in camps in the Libyan desert. Jamal Abu Ahmad, a former member of Egyptian Islamic Jihad, was released from Egyptian prison after the fall of the Mubarak regime, after which he began assembling a terrorist network. He received financing from the Yemen-based Al-Qaeda in the Arabian Peninsula, petitioned Al-Qaeda leader Ayman al-Zawahiri to establish a new Al-Qaeda affiliate he called al-Qaeda in Egypt, and was subsequently detained by Egyptian authorities in December 2012.

On October 7, 2013, the Muhammad Jamal network (MJN) and Muhammad Jamal were designated as Specially Designated Global Terrorists by the U.S. Department of State, which noted in its designation that "Jamal has developed connections with al-Qa'ida in the Islamic Maghreb (AQIM), AQ senior leadership, and al-Qa'ida in the Arabian Peninsula (AQAP) leadership including Nasir 'Abd-al-Karim 'Abdullah al-Wahishi and Qasim Yahya Mahdi al-Rimi". A few days later, on October 21, 2013, the United Nations Security Council designated the Muhammad Jamal network "as being associated with Al-Qaida". The United Nations Security Council also noted, "Some of the attackers of the U.S. Mission in Benghazi on 11 September 2012 have been identified as associates of Muhammad Jamal, and some of the Benghazi attackers reportedly trained at MJN camps in Libya."

In March 2013, Faraj al-Shibli was detained by Libyan authorities and questioned by the FBI because of his suspected involvement in the Benghazi attack. Al-Shibli was detained after he returned from a trip to Pakistan, though his exact role in the attack is unclear. He was a member of the Libyan Islamic Fighting Group, which tried to overthrow the Gadhafi regime in the mid-1990s. Investigators have learned he has had contact with both the Yemen-based Al-Qaeda in the Arabian Peninsula and Al-Qaeda members in Pakistan. He was released by Libyan authorities on June 12, 2013, based on claims there was a lack of evidence to hold him in custody. In July 2014 he was found dead in Libya.

On February 6, 2026, the United States announced that it had captured a key participant in the attack named Zubayr Al-Bakoush. Following his arrest, Al-Bakoush was then transferred from Misrata, Libya and landed at Manassas Regional Airport in Virginia at 3 a.m. Al-Bakoush is believed to have "conducted surveillance activity" after entering the compound when the fires were set and tried to gain access to the vehicles which were located on the grounds of the compound.

== Aftermath ==
=== Libyan response ===
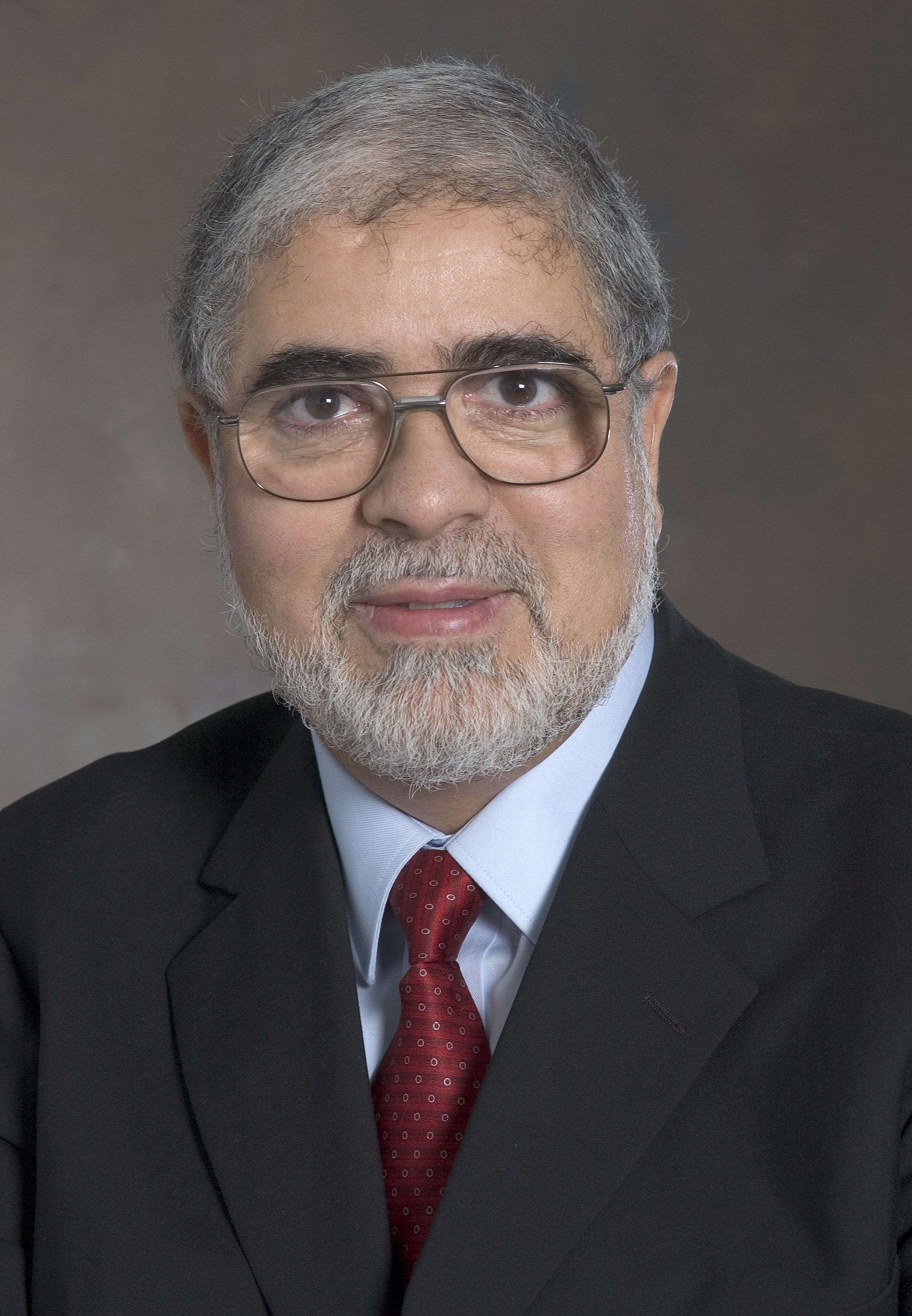
Prime Minister Abushagur

Libyan Prime Minister Mustafa Abushagur's office condemned the attack and extended condolences, saying: "While strongly condemning any attempt to abuse the person of Muhammad, or an insult to our holy places and prejudice against the faith, we reject and strongly condemn the use of force to terrorize innocent people and the killing of innocent people." It also reaffirmed "the depth of relationship between the peoples of Libya and the U.S., which grew closer with the positions taken by the U.S. government in support of the revolution of February 17". Mohamed Yousef el-Magariaf, the President of the General National Congress of Libya, said: "We apologize to the U.S., to the American people and to the government and also to the rest of the world for what happened yesterday. And at the same time, we expect the world to cooperate with us to confront to what is meant out of this kind of act of cowardice."

There were demonstrations in Benghazi and Tripoli on September 12, condemning the violence and holding signs such as "Chris Stevens was a friend to all Libyans", "Benghazi is against terrorism", and other signs apologizing to Americans for the actions in their name and in the name of Muslims. On the same day, Libya's Deputy Ambassador to the United Kingdom Ahmad Jibril told the BBC that Ansar Al-Sharia was behind the attack. On September 13, at a U.S. State Department reception in Washington D.C., the Libyan ambassador to the U.S. Ali Aujali apologized to Secretary of State Clinton for "this terrorist attack which took place against the American consulate in Libya". The ambassador further praised Stevens as a "dear friend" and a "real hero". He also urged the United States to continue supporting Libya as it went "through a very difficult time" and that the young Libyan government needed help so that it could "maintain ... security and stability in our country".

In the days after the attack, The New York Times stated that young Libyans had flooded Twitter with pro-American messages after the attacks. Think Progress stated that Libyans are typically more positively inclined towards the United States than their neighbors. A 2012 Gallup poll noted that "A majority of Libyans (54%) surveyed in March and April 2012 approve of the leadership of the U.S.—among the highest approval Gallup has ever recorded in the ... region, outside of Israel." Another poll in Eastern Libya, taken in 2011, reported that the population was at the same time both deeply religious conservative Muslims and very pro-American, with 90% of respondents reporting favorable views of the United States.

The Libyan response to the crisis was praised and appreciated in the United States, and President Obama emphasized how the Libyans "helped our diplomats to safety" to an American audience the following day, while a New York Times editorial criticized Egypt's government for not doing "what Libyan leaders did".

On September 16, Libyan President Mohamed Magariaf said that the attack on the United States consulate was planned months in advance, and further stated that "[t]he idea that this criminal and cowardly act was a spontaneous protest that just spun out of control is completely unfounded and preposterous. We firmly believe that this was a precalculated, preplanned attack that was carried out specifically to attack the U.S. consulate."

==== Anti-militia demonstrations ====
On September 21, about 30,000 Libyans marched through Benghazi calling for support of the rule of law and for an end to the armed militias that had formed during the Libyan civil war to oppose Colonel Gaddafi. After that war, the militias failed to disband, and continually menaced the Libyan government and populace. Carrying signs with slogans such as "We Want Justice For Chris" and "Libya Lost a Friend", the protestors stormed several militia headquarters, including that of Ansar al-Sharia, an Islamist militia who some allege played a role in the attack on U.S. diplomatic personnel on September 11. At least 10 people were killed and dozens more wounded as militiamen fired on demonstrators at the headquarters of Sahaty Brigade, a pro-government militia "operating under the authority of the ministry of defence".

By early next morning, the protestors had forced militia members to flee and seized control of a number of compounds, releasing four prisoners found inside. Protesters burnt a car and a building of at least one facility, and looted weapons. The militia compounds and many weapons were handed over to Libya's national army in what "appeared to be part of a coordinated sweep of militia bases by police, government troops and activists" following the earlier demonstrations. Some militia members accused the protestors of being Gaddafi loyalists, looking to disarm the militias in the wake of the revolution.

==== Government campaign to disband militias ====
On September 23, taking advantage of the growing momentum and rising anger against the militias evinced in the earlier anti-militia demonstrations, the Libyan president declared that all unauthorized militias had 48 hours to either disband or come under government control. The government also mandated that bearing arms in public was now illegal, as were armed checkpoints.

Handling the militias had been difficult as the government had been forced to rely on some of them for protection and security. According to a Libyan interviewed in Tripoli, the government gained the ability to push back against the militias because of a "mandate of the people". On September 24, the government commenced with a raid on a former military base held by a rogue infantry militia.

Across the country, militias began surrendering to the government. The government formed a "National Mobile Force" for the purpose of evicting illegal militias. On the same day as the declaration, various militias in Misrata held meetings, ultimately deciding to submit to the government's authority, and handed over various public facilities they had been holding, including the city's three main jails, which were handed over to the authority of the Ministry of Justice. Hours before the announcement, in Derna, the two main militias (one of them Ansar al-Sharia) active in the city both withdrew, leaving both their five military bases behind.

Hundreds of Libyans, mainly former rebel fighters, gathered in the city centers of Tripoli and Benghazi to hand over their weapons to the government on September 29. The campaign has been less successful in other areas, such as the remote Nafusa Mountains, inhabited by the Nafusi-speaking Berber minority, where the Emirati news agency The National reported on September 23 that arms were being hoarded. The National also reported arms being hoarded in Misrata, despite simultaneous reporting by other outlets that militias were surrendering in Misrata.

=== U.S. government response ===
President Barack Obama, with Secretary of State Hillary Rodham Clinton, delivering a statement at the White House on September 12, 2012, in which he condemned the attack on the U.S. consulate

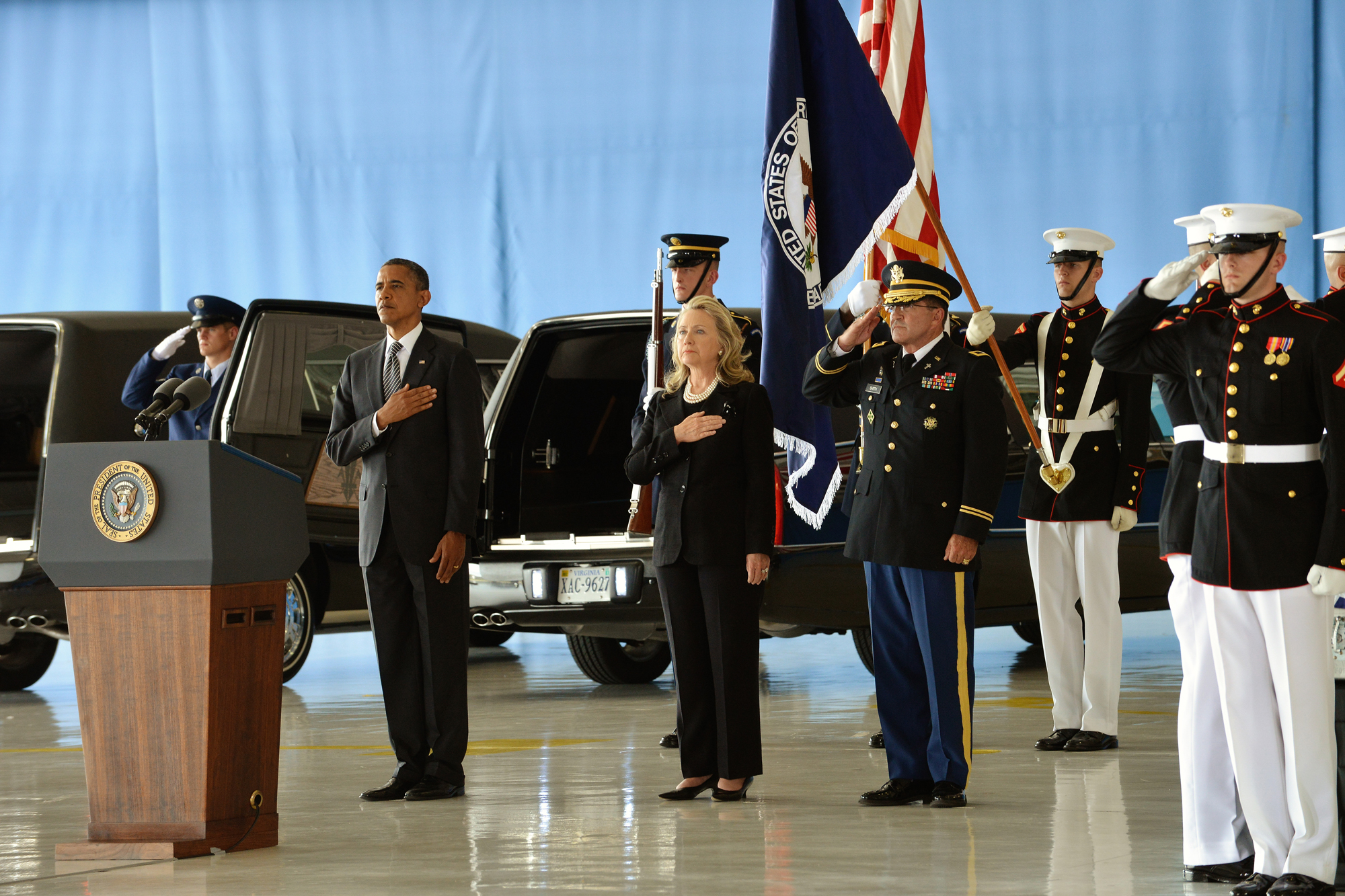
President Obama and Secretary Clinton honor the Benghazi attack victims at the Transfer of Remains Ceremony held at Andrews Air Force Base on September 14, 2012.

On September 12, U.S. President Barack Obama condemned "this outrageous attack" on U.S. diplomatic facilities and stated that "since our founding, the United States has been a nation that respects all faiths. We reject all efforts to denigrate the religious beliefs of others." After referring to "the 9/11 attacks", "troops who made the ultimate sacrifice in Iraq and Afghanistan", and "then last night, we learned the news of this attack in Benghazi" the President urged, "As Americans, let us never, ever forget that our freedom is only sustained because there are people who are willing to fight for it, to stand up for it, and in some cases, lay down their lives for it." He then went on to say,

No acts of terror will ever shake the resolve of this great nation, alter that character, or eclipse the light of the values that we stand for. Today we mourn four more Americans who represent the very best of the United States of America. We will not waver in our commitment to see that justice is done for this terrible act. And make no mistake, justice will be done.

After the attack, Obama ordered that security be increased at all such facilities worldwide. A 50-member Marine FAST team was sent to Libya to "bolster security". It was announced that the FBI would investigate the possibility of the attack being planned. U.S. officials said surveillance over Libya would increase, including the use of unmanned drones, to "hunt for the attackers".

Secretary of State Clinton also made a statement on September 12, describing the perpetrators as "heavily armed militants" and "a small and savage group—not the people or government of Libya". She also reaffirmed "America's commitment to religious tolerance" and said "Some have sought to justify this vicious behavior, along with the protest that took place at our Embassy in Cairo yesterday, as a response to inflammatory material posted on the Internet," but whether true or not, that was not a justification for violence. The State Department had previously identified embassy and personnel security as a major challenge in its budget and priorities report.

On September 12, it was reported that the United States Navy dispatched two Arleigh Burke-class destroyers, USS McFaul and USS Laboon, to the Libyan coast. The destroyers are equipped with Tomahawk cruise missiles. American UAVs were also sent to fly over Libya to search for the perpetrators of the attack.

In a speech on September 13, in Golden, Colorado, President Obama paid tribute to the four Americans "killed in an attack on our diplomatic post in Libya", stating,

We enjoy our security and our liberty because of the sacrifices they make ... I want people around the world to hear me: To all those who would do us harm, no act of terror will go unpunished. It will not dim the light of the values that we proudly present to the rest of the world.

In his press briefing on September 14, White House Press Secretary Jay Carney told reporters that "we don't have and did not have concrete evidence to suggest that this [the Benghazi attack] was not in reaction to the film." He went on to say:

There was no intelligence that in any way could have been acted on to prevent these attacks. It is—I mean, I think the DNI spokesman was very declarative about this that the report is false. The report suggested that there was intelligence that was available prior to this that led us to believe that this facility would be attacked, and that is false ... We have no information to suggest that it was a preplanned attack. The unrest we've seen around the region has been in reaction to a video that Muslims, many Muslims find offensive. And while the violence is reprehensible and unjustified, it is not a reaction to the 9/11 anniversary that we know of, or to U.S. policy.

On September 14, the remains of the slain Americans were returned to the U.S.; President Obama and Secretary of State Hillary Clinton attended the ceremony. In her remarks Clinton said, "One young woman, her head covered and her eyes haunted with sadness, held up a handwritten sign that said 'Thugs and killers don't represent Benghazi nor Islam.' The President of the Palestinian Authority, who worked closely with Chris when he served in Jerusalem, sent me a letter remembering his energy and integrity, and deploring—and I quote—'an act of ugly terror.'" She went on to say: "We've seen the heavy assault on our post in Benghazi that took the lives of those brave men."

On September 16, the U.S. Ambassador to the UN Susan Rice appeared on five major interview shows to discuss the attacks. Prior to her appearance, Rice was provided with "talking points" from a CIA memo, which stated:

The currently available information suggests that the demonstrations in Benghazi were spontaneously inspired by the protests at the U.S. Embassy in Cairo and evolved into a direct assault against the U.S. diplomatic post in Benghazi and subsequently its annex. There are indications that extremists participated in the violent demonstrations.

This assessment may change as additional information is collected and analyzed and as currently available information continues to be evaluated.

The investigation is ongoing, and the U.S. government is working with Libyan authorities to bring to justice those responsible for the deaths of U.S. citizens.

Using these talking points as a guide, Rice stated:

Based on the best information we have to date, what our assessment is as of the present is in fact what began spontaneously in Benghazi as a reaction to what had transpired some hours earlier in Cairo where, of course, as you know, there was a violent protest outside of our embassy—sparked by this hateful video. But soon after that spontaneous protest began outside of our consulate in Benghazi, we believe that it looks like extremist elements, individuals, joined in that— in that effort with heavy weapons of the sort that are, unfortunately, readily now available in Libya post-revolution. And that it spun from there into something much, much more violent. We do not—we do not have information at present that leads us to conclude that this was premeditated or preplanned. I think it's clear that there were extremist elements that joined in and escalated the violence. Whether they were al Qaeda affiliates, whether they were Libyan-based extremists or al Qaeda itself I think is one of the things we'll have to determine.

Since Rice's five television appearances, there have been persistent accusations that she had intentionally and repeatedly lied. However, none of the ten Benghazi investigations determined she had. For example, the Republican-controlled House Intelligence Committee "did not conclude that Rice or any other government official acted in bad faith or intentionally misled the American people," according to the Associated Press.

In a White House press briefing on September 18, press secretary Jay Carney explained the attack to reporters: "I'm saying that based on information that we—our initial information, and that includes all information—we saw no evidence to back up claims by others that this was a preplanned or premeditated attack; that we saw evidence that it was sparked by the reaction to this video. And that is what we know thus far based on the evidence, concrete evidence."

On September 20, White House Press Secretary Jay Carney answered a question about an open hearing with the National Counterterrorism Center Director, Matthew G. Olsen, which referenced which extremist groups might have been involved. Carney said, "It is, I think, self-evident that what happened in Benghazi was a terrorist attack. Our embassy was attacked violently, and the result was four deaths of American officials. So, again, that's self-evident." On the same day, during an appearance on Univision, a Spanish-language television network in the United States, President Obama stated, "What we do know is that the natural protests that arose because of the outrage over the video were used as an excuse by extremists to see if they can also directly harm U.S. interests."

Also on September 20, Secretary of State Hillary Clinton gave a classified briefing to U.S. Senators, which several Republican attendees criticized. According to the article, senators were angered at the Obama administration's rebuff of their attempts to learn details of the Benghazi attack, only to see that information published the next day in The New York Times and The Wall Street Journal.

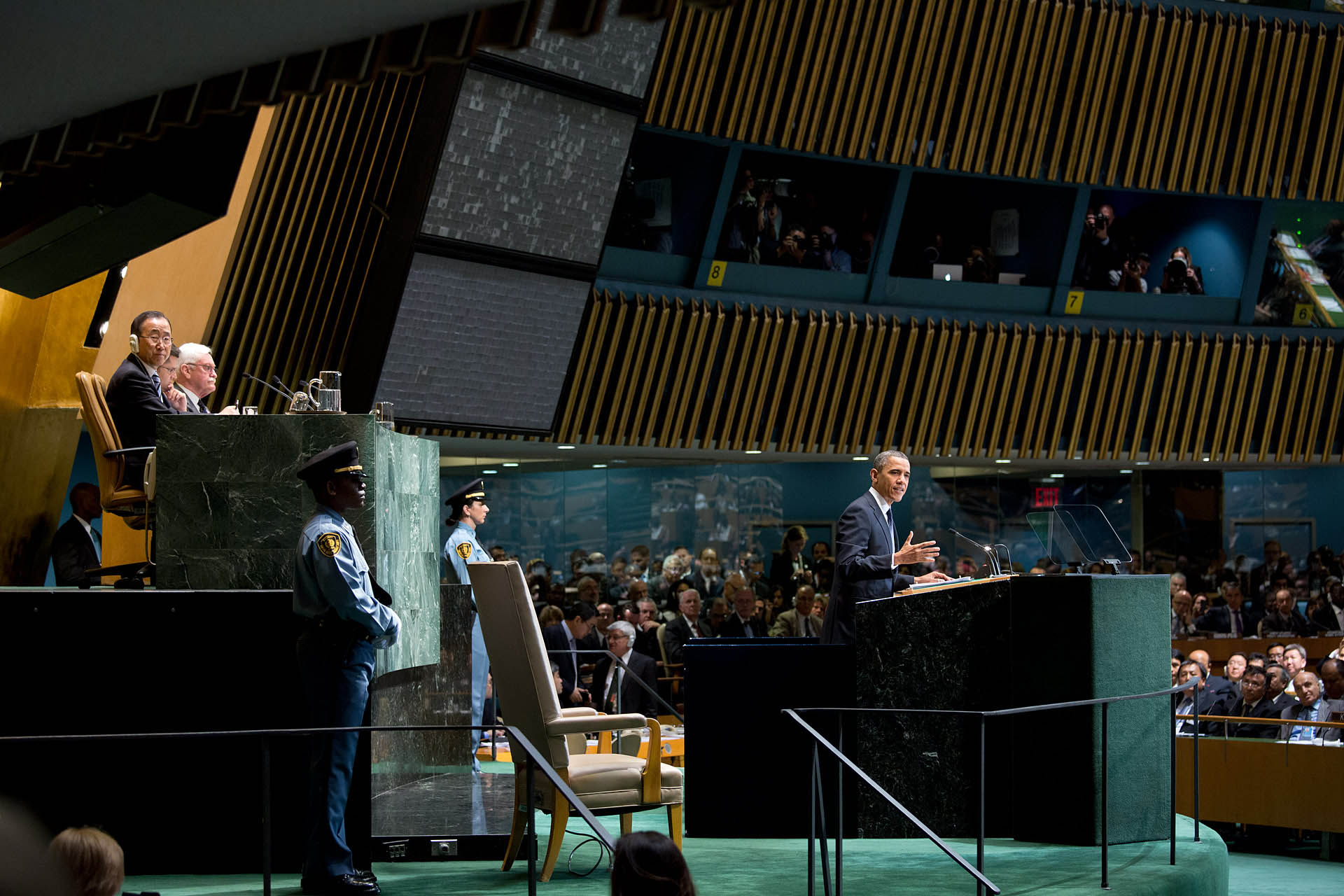
President Barack Obama addresses the United Nations General Assembly.

On September 24, advertisements condemning an anti-Islam video appeared on Pakistani television. The television ads in Pakistan (marked with the U.S. Embassy seal) feature clips of President Obama and Secretary of State Clinton during press appearances in Washington in which they condemned the video. Their words were subtitled in Urdu.

On September 25, in an address before the United Nations General Assembly President Obama stated, "The attacks on our civilians in Benghazi were attacks on America ... And there should be no doubt that we will be relentless in tracking down the killers and bringing them to justice." He referred to Innocence of Muslims as "a crude and disgusting video [that] sparked outrage throughout the Muslim world". He said, "I have made it clear that the United States government had nothing to do with this video, and I believe its message must be rejected by all who respect our common humanity." He further stated, "There is no video that justifies an attack on an Embassy."

On September 26, Clinton acknowledged a possible link between al-Qaeda in the Islamic Maghreb and the Benghazi attack.

On September 28, a spokesman for the Director of National Intelligence stated,

In the immediate aftermath, there was information that led us to assess that the attack began spontaneously following protests earlier that day at our embassy in Cairo. We provided that initial assessment to Executive Branch officials and members of Congress ... As we learned more about the attack, we revised our initial assessment to reflect new information indicating that it was a deliberate and organized terrorist attack carried out by extremists. It remains unclear if any group or person exercised overall command and control of the attack, and if extremist group leaders directed their members to participate.

Also on September 28, it was reported that Nakoula Basseley Nakoula, the producer of the Innocence of Muslims video, had been arrested in California and was being held without bail for alleged probation violations stemming from a 2010 bank fraud conviction.

On CNN's State of the Union with Candy Crowley on September 30, Crowley observed that "Friday we got the administration's sort of definitive statement that this now looks as though it was a pre-planned attack by a terrorist group, some of whom were at least sympathetic to al Qaeda," and asked the senior Republican on the Senate Armed Services Committee, Senator John McCain, "why do you think and are you bothered that it has taken them this long from September 11th to now to get to this conclusion?" to which McCain replied that "it interferes with the depiction that the administration is trying to convey that al Qaeda is on the wane ... how else could you trot out our U.N. ambassador to say this was a spontaneous demonstration? ... It was either willful ignorance or abysmal intelligence to think that people come to spontaneous demonstrations with heavy weapons, mortars, and the attack goes on for hours."

On October 4, 22 days after the attack, FBI investigators were finally allowed access to the scene of the attack. The crime scene was not secured during that time; neither American nor Libyan investigators were able to secure the scene. The hearing testimony revealed that "Hicks argued that Rice's comments so insulted the Libyan president—since they contradicted his Sept. 16 claims that the attack was premeditated—that it slowed the FBI's investigation. 'President Magariaf was insulted in front of his own people, in front of the world. His credibility was reduced,' Hicks said, adding that the president was apparently 'still steamed' two weeks later."

To assist the Libyan government in disbanding extremist groups, the Obama administration allocated $8 million to begin building an elite Libyan commando force over the next year.

In the Presidential debate of October 16, 2012, between President Obama and Mitt Romney, Romney claimed that "it took the president 14 days before he called the attack in Benghazi an act of terror." President Obama responded, "The day after the attack, governor, I stood in the Rose Garden and I told the American people and the world that we are going to find out exactly what happened," Obama said. "That this was an act of terror, and I also said that we're going to hunt down those who committed this crime." When Romney challenged Obama, asking "You said in the Rose Garden the day after the attack, it was an act of terror. It was not a spontaneous demonstration, is that what you're saying?" the President responded, "Please proceed, governor" and "Get the transcript." The moderator of the debate, Candy Crowley, agreed, stating "He—he did call it an act of terror." A CNN analysis stated that Obama had indeed referred to the incident as a "terrorist attack", but that Romney was correct in noting that the administration delayed in conclusively stating that the attack was not a spontaneous protest related to the video. A May 14, 2013 Fact Checker by Glenn Kesler said that "Immediately after the attack, the president three times used the phrase "act of terror" in public statements."

On October 19, 2012, House Oversight Committee Chairman Darrell Issa (R–CA) came under fire from intelligence officials in the Obama administration when he posted, on a public website, 166 pages of sensitive but unclassified State Department communications related to Libya. According to officials, the release of the unredacted documents compromised the identities of several Libyans working with the U.S. government and placed their lives in danger.

On CBS's Face the Nation on October 28, Senator John McCain (R–AZ) stated that "this is either a massive cover-up or incompetence" and suggested that it was a scandal worse than Watergate. McCain stated, "we know that there were tapes, recordings inside the consulate during this fight ... So the president went on various shows, despite what he said in the Rose Garden, about terrorist acts, he went on several programs, including The View, including Letterman, including before the UN where he continued to refer, days later, many days later, to this as a spontaneous demonstration because of a hateful video. We know that is patently false. What did the president know? When did he know it? And what did he do about it?" CBS News reported earlier on October 24 that the video of the assault was not recovered until 20 days after the attack, from the more than 10 security cameras at the compound. In a radio interview October 29, 2012, Senator John McCain said that the surveillance tapes had been classified top secret.

Secretary Clinton was scheduled to testify before Congress on December 20 about the attack. On December 15, it was reported that she had become dehydrated from the flu, fainted, and sustained a concussion. Consequently, her testimony was postponed. The incident prompted Republican Rep. Allen West to claim that the illness was a ruse intended to avoid testifying. Former UN Ambassador John Bolton called the concussion a "diplomatic illness".

On January 23, 2013, during testimony at a Senate hearing on Benghazi, Clinton engaged in a heated exchange with Senator Ron Johnson. When Johnson pressed her to explain why, in the immediate aftermath, no one from the State Department had asked American evacuees if there had been a protest before the attack, Clinton replied:

With all due respect, the fact is, we had four dead Americans! Was it because of a protest or was it because of guys out for a walk one night and decided they'd go kill some Americans?! What difference, at this point, does it make?! It is our job to figure out what happened and do everything we can to prevent it from ever happening again, Senator. Now, honestly, I will do my best to answer your questions about this, but the fact is that people were trying in real time to get to the best information. The [Intelligence Community] has a process, I understand, going with the other committees to explain how these talking points came out. But you know, to be clear, it is, from my perspective, less important today looking backwards as to why these militants decided they did it than to find them and bring them to justice, and then maybe we'll figure out what was going on in the meantime.

In March 2013, Representative Duncan D. Hunter introduced legislation into the 113th Congress to authorize awarding of Congressional Gold Medals to Doherty and Woods for their actions that led to their deaths.

In April 2013, the Pentagon announced the activation of a USMC quick response force for North Africa that would use the range and speed of the Bell Boeing V-22 Osprey to be able to respond to similar events in the future. Spain authorized the basing of the quick response force at Morón Air Base near Seville, for a temporary one-year term.

On May 13, 2013, President Obama stated during a news conference, "The day after it happened, I acknowledged that this was an act of terrorism." This claim was disputed by Glenn Kessler of The Washington Post in a "Fact Checker" article, which explored at length the difference in meaning between the phrases "act of terror" and "act of terrorism." In the article, Kessler accused Obama of "revisionist history" for stating he had called the attack an "act of terrorism" when in fact he had used the term "act of terror", observing that Obama had gone out of his way to avoid calling the incident an "act of terrorism" or blame the ambassador's death on terrorism.

On July 30, 2013, Rep. Ed Royce (R, CA-39) introduced the Department of State Operations and Embassy Security Authorization Act, Fiscal Year 2014 (H.R. 2848; 113th Congress). Supporters argued,

This bill advances efforts to improve the physical infrastructure at posts overseas to comply with the highest standards of protection; to increase training for those responsible for guarding our compounds and personnel; to put in place procedures that respond appropriately to threats, reducing the chances of another attack like that suffered in Benghazi, Libya; to review the policies and procedures of the Bureau of Diplomatic Security; to authorize the use of best value contracting at high risk, high threat posts; to authorize security improvements at soft targets; and to provide for security enhancements in line with Accountability Review Board recommendations.

Critics including Republican Party members accused the Obama White House and State Department of overemphasizing or fabricating the role of Islamic anger over the anti-Islamic movie Innocence of Muslims and alleged that the administration was reluctant to label the attack as "terrorist". Representative Mike Rogers (R–MI), chairman of the House Intelligence Committee, who on September 13 said that the attacks had all the hallmarks of a coordinated attack by al-Qaeda, has questioned whether there were any protests at all in Benghazi, saying: "I have seen no information that shows that there was a protest going on as you have seen around any other embassy at the time. It was clearly designed to be an attack." According to critics, the consulate site should have been secured better both before and after the attack. GOP legislators also took issue with delays in the investigation, which CNN attributed to "bureaucratic infighting" between the FBI, Justice, and State. On September 26, Senator Johnny Isakson (R–GA) said he "cannot believe that the FBI is not on the ground yet".

Testimony from top U.S. commanders after the attack revealed that the military was unprepared for conflict across Africa and the Middle East. No attack aircraft had been placed on high alert on September 11, the anniversary of the September 11 attacks in 2001, and the closest fighter planes to trouble spots in North Africa were based in Aviano, Italy. The fighter planes based in Aviano were unarmed and no aerial refueling planes were within a 10-hour flight to the base. In addition, no AC-130 gunships were within a 10-hour flight of Libya, and their crews did not reach a staging base in Italy until 19 hours after the attack began.

With the attack and subsequent criticism occurring in the last two months of the 2012 U.S. presidential election, Democrats and liberal media figures accused Republicans of politicizing the attacks in an unprecedented manner. Romney was accused by the Obama campaign of trying to exploit the attacks for political gain, leading the father of Ambassador Stevens to call for both campaigns to avoid making it a campaign issue.

Robert Gates, former CIA director and Defense Secretary under Republican Presidents and then President Obama, said that some critics of the government's response have a "cartoonish" view of military capabilities. He stated that he would have responded with equal caution given the risks and the lack of intelligence on the ground, and that American forces require planning and preparation, which the circumstances did not allow for.

President Obama called the criticism a "sideshow" and later accused Congress of "taking its eye off the ball" on the subject of the economy and focusing on "phony scandals". White House Spokesman Jay Carney later specified that the criticism of the administration's handling of the Benghazi attacks was one of those "phony scandals".

On December 10, 2014, upon publication of the House Permanent Select Committee on Intelligence report on Benghazi, Committee Chairman Mike Rogers wrote in an op-ed piece, "The Obama administration's White House and State Department actions before, during, and after the Benghazi terrorist attack on September 11, 2012, ranged from incompetence to deplorable political manipulation in the midst of an election season." However, immediately upon release of the committee's report on November 21, 2014, the Associated Press reported that the Committee did not conclude that any "government official acted in bad faith or intentionally misled the American people."

For actions in Benghazi during the attack, Marine Gunnery Sergeant Tate Jolly was awarded the Navy Cross, and Army Master Sergeant David R. Halbruner was awarded the Distinguished Service Cross.

In January 2020 Mustafa al-Imam, a Libyan man accused of scouting for the Benghazi attackers, was sentenced to over 19 years in prison by a federal Washington judge.

=== U.S. media response ===
The Center for Media and Public Affairs at George Mason University described the conclusions of an unpublished study on November 2, 2012. Based on a textual analysis that tallied the occurrence of certain words and phrases in news reports during the days immediately following the attack, the study concluded that leading newspapers in the U.S. framed the attack in terms of a spontaneous protest over the anti-Islamic film Innocence of Muslims as framed by the Obama administration's version, four times as often as a planned terrorist attack, which was the Republican version. However, the 2014 final report by the Republican-controlled House Intelligence Committee found that during the days immediately following the attack there was confusion among intelligence analysts as to the origin of the attack, leading to an initial assessment that it was the spontaneous outcome from a protest. Obama administration officials, most notably Susan Rice, were provided this early assessment and repeated it to media outlets, only to be later contradicted as further intelligence assessments were made. None of the ten investigations into Benghazi found that any senior Obama administration officials had acted improperly.

On September 13, Rachel Maddow, during her show on MSNBC, stated:

An organized attack. Anybody who tells you that what happened to our ambassador and our consulate in Libya was as a result of a protest over an offensive movie, you should ask them why they think that. That's the first version of events we heard. That does not seem to explain what happened that night or by the facts or the more facts we get.

On the edition of October 24 of Fox News' Special Report with Bret Baier, syndicated columnist Charles Krauthammer claimed that a State Department e-mail, which passed along a report from Embassy Tripoli that Ansar al-Sharia had claimed responsibility for the attack on Facebook and Twitter, proved that the White House knew of terrorist connections to the attack almost immediately. However, the day after the Benghazi attack, Ansar al-Sharia issued a statement saying that the attack was in part "a spontaneous popular uprising in response to what happened by the West," which was an apparent reference to the Innocence of Muslims video.

Conservative pundit Jonah Goldberg of the National Review stated that on NBC's Meet the Press, host David Gregory changed the subject when a guest raised the subject of the Benghazi attack, saying, "Let's get to Libya a little bit later", but never returned to the subject.

On November 26, 2012, journalist Tom Ricks went on Fox News' Happening Now with Jon Scott to discuss the attack. While being interviewed on Fox News by Jon Scott, Ricks accused Fox News of being "extremely political" in its coverage of the attack and said that "Fox was operating as a wing of the Republican Party." Ricks accused the network of covering the story more than it needed to be. The interview was cut short and Ricks and the interview was not mentioned or covered by Fox News again. Fox News was subsequently criticized for cutting the interview short. In an interview with the Associated Press, Fox News' White House correspondent Ed Henry suggested that he thought Benghazi was being covered too much by the network. Henry said, "We've had the proper emphasis, but I would not be so deluded to say that some of our shows, some of our commentators, have covered it more than it needed to be covered."

== Investigations ==
There were ten investigations into the Benghazi matter: one by the FBI; one by an independent board commissioned by the State Department; two by Democrat-controlled Senate Committees; and six by Republican-controlled House Committees. After the first five Republican investigations found no evidence of wrongdoing by senior Obama administration officials, Republicans in 2014 opened a sixth investigation, the House Select Committee on Benghazi, chaired by Trey Gowdy. This investigation also failed to find any evidence of wrongdoing by senior Obama administration officials. A possible political motive for the investigation was revealed on September 29, 2015, when Republican House majority leader Kevin McCarthy, then vying to become Speaker of the House, told Sean Hannity on Fox News that the investigation was part of a "strategy to fight and win,' adding "Everybody thought Hillary Clinton was unbeatable, right? But we put together a Benghazi special committee, a select committee. What are her numbers today? Her numbers are dropping." The United States Marines responsible for State Department security, the security lapse was called "the result of opportunism" in 2012 by Carney.

Shortly after the Benghazi attack, Secretary of State Clinton commissioned an independent Accountability Review Board to investigate, chaired by retired ambassador Thomas R. Pickering with vice-chair retired Chairman of the Joint Chiefs of Staff Michael Mullen. The Board released their final report on December 19, 2012. It made 29 recommendations to the State Department on how to improve its operations, which Clinton pledged to implement. As part of this investigation, four career State Department officials were criticized for denying requests for additional security at the facility prior to the attack. By the end of 2012, Eric J. Boswell, the Assistant Secretary of State for Diplomatic Security, resigned under pressure, while three others were suspended. None of the other Benghazi investigations identified wrongdoing by any individuals.

The House Select Committee on Benghazi's final report was released on June 28, 2016, and the committee closed down five months later. It criticized the actions and speed of response of the State Department, and the Defense Department, leading up to and during the attacks in Benghazi. No further public investigations have been conducted since.

The findings of the two-year investigation by the Republican-controlled House Intelligence Committee, the fifth of six Republican investigations, was summarized by the Associated Press on November 21, 2014:

A two-year investigation by the Republican-controlled House Intelligence Committee has found that the CIA and the military acted properly in responding to the 2012 attack on a U.S. diplomatic compound in Benghazi, Libya, and asserted no wrongdoing by Obama administration appointees.

Debunking a series of persistent allegations hinting at dark conspiracies, the investigation of the politically charged incident determined that there was no intelligence failure, no delay in sending a CIA rescue team, no missed opportunity for a military rescue, and no evidence the CIA was covertly shipping arms from Libya to Syria.

In the immediate aftermath of the attack, intelligence about who carried it out and why was contradictory, the report found. That led Susan Rice, then U.S. ambassador to the United Nations, to inaccurately assert that the attack had evolved from a protest, when in fact there had been no protest. But it was intelligence analysts, not political appointees, who made the wrong call, the committee found. The report did not conclude that Rice or any other government official acted in bad faith or intentionally misled the American people.

...

In the aftermath of the attacks, Republicans criticized the Obama administration and its then-secretary of state, Hillary Rodham Clinton, who ran for president in 2016. People in and out of government have alleged that a CIA response team was ordered to "stand down" after the State Department compound came under attack, that a military rescue was nixed, that officials intentionally downplayed the role of al-Qaida figures in the attack, and that Stevens and the CIA were involved in a secret operation to spirit weapons out of Libya and into the hands of Syrian rebels. None of that is true, according to the House Intelligence Committee report.

The report did find, however, that the State Department facility where Stevens and Smith were killed was not well-protected, and that State Department security agents knew they could not defend it from a well-armed attack. Previous reports have found that requests for security improvements were not acted upon in Washington.

== FOIA requests ==
Freedom of Information Act requests have been made since the attack. The conservative activist group Judicial Watch filed a FOIA request to the Department of State on December 19, 2012. An acknowledgement of the request was received by Judicial Watch on January 4, 2013. When the State Department failed to respond to the request by February 4, 2013, Judicial Watch filed a lawsuit, which resulted in seven photographs being delivered on June 6, 2013. Three of the photographs show Arabic-language spray paint graffiti.

On May 30, 2013, it was reported that the Republican National Committee filed a FOIA for "any and all emails or other documents containing the terms 'Libya' and/or 'Benghazi' dated between September 11, 2012 and November 7, 2012 directed from or to U.S. Department of State employees originating from, or addressed to, persons whose email addresses end in either 'barackobama.com' or 'dnc.org'".

On April 18, 2014, Judicial Watch released more than 100 pages of documents obtained through a FOIA lawsuit. One email, dated September 14, 2012, with a subject line "RE PREP CALL with Susan: Saturday at 4:00 pm ET", was from deputy national security advisor for strategic communications Rhodes stated: "Goals: ... To underscore that these protests are rooted in an Internet video, and not a broader failure of policy..." According to another e-mail obtained by Judicial Watch, when asked about whether the attack was linked to the Mohammad video, State Department spokesperson Victoria Nuland said she "could not confirm a connect as we simply don't know—and we won't know until there is an investigation".

According to The Wall Street Journal, the e-mail was written to prepare U.S. Ambassador to the UN Susan Rice for her appearances on Sunday news shows two days later, and it "sets out the Administration's view of the cause of the Benghazi attacks". John Dickerson of Slate says the e-mail refers to the worldwide protests against Innocence of Muslims and not the Benghazi attack.

== See also ==
- Attacks on the United States
- December 2019 United States airstrikes in Iraq and Syria
- Ambassadors of the United States killed in office
- International response to Innocence of Muslims protests
- 13 Hours – 2014 book about the attack
- 13 Hours: The Secret Soldiers of Benghazi – 2016 film about the attack based on the book
