= J. Christopher Stevens =

American diplomat and lawyer (1960–2012)

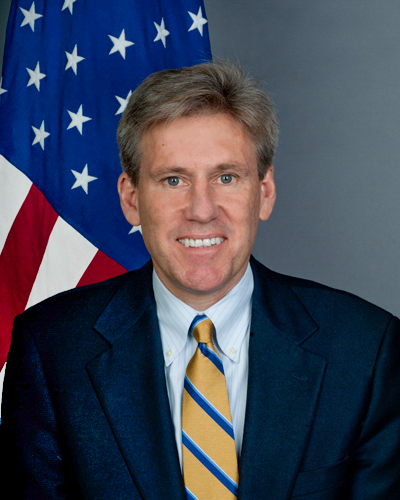
- Official portrait, 2012

10th United States Ambassador to Libya
- In office June 7, 2012 – September 11, 2012
- President: Barack Obama
- Preceded by: Gene Cretz
- Succeeded by: Laurence Pope (as Chargé d'affaires)

Personal details
- Born: John Christopher Stevens; April 18, 1960 Grass Valley, California, U.S.
- Died: September 11, 2012 (aged 52) Benghazi, Libya
- Cause of death: Assassinated during 2012 Benghazi attack
- Party: Democratic
- Education: University of California, Berkeley (BA); University of California, Hastings (JD); National Defense University (MS)

John Christopher Stevens (April 18, 1960 – September 11, 2012) was an American career diplomat and lawyer who served as the U.S. ambassador to Libya from May 22, 2012, to September 11, 2012. Stevens was killed when the U.S. Special Mission in Benghazi, Libya, was attacked by members of Ansar al-Sharia on September 11–12, 2012., making Stevens the eighth and most recent U.S. ambassador to be killed while in office.

== Early life and education ==
Stevens was born on April 18, 1960, in Grass Valley, California, the eldest of three siblings born to Jan S. Stevens, a California Assistant Attorney General, and his wife Mary J. Stevens (née Floris; born 1937), from a West Coast family of French, Swedish and Chinook ancestry. Stevens was raised in Northern California and had two younger siblings, Anne (born 1962) and Thomas (born 1965).

Stevens' parents divorced in 1975, and both remarried. Stevens himself never married. His mother, a cellist, joined the Marin Symphony Orchestra (1969–2004), and in 1976 married Robert Commanday, a music critic with the San Francisco Chronicle.

Stevens was an AFS Intercultural Programs exchange student in Spain during the summer of 1977, and graduated from Piedmont High School in 1978. He earned BA degree in history in 1982 at the University of California, Berkeley, where he was a member of Alpha Tau Omega fraternity. From 1983 to 1985, he taught English as a Peace Corps volunteer in Morocco. He graduated with a JD degree from University of California, Hastings College of Law in 1989, and received an MS degree from the National War College of National Defense University in 2010.

== Career ==
=== Lawyer ===
Prior to joining the United States Foreign Service, Stevens worked briefly at the law firm of Pillsbury, Madison & Sutro, in its San Francisco office. Later, Stevens was an international trade attorney based in Washington, D.C. He was admitted as an active member of the State Bar of California on January 26, 1990; he went on an inactive status on August 1, 1991, and remained an inactive member for the remainder of his career.

=== U.S. Foreign Service ===
Stevens joined the United States Foreign Service in 1991. His early overseas assignments included: deputy principal officer and political section chief in Jerusalem, political officer in Damascus, consular/political officer in Cairo, and consular/economic officer in Riyadh. In Washington, Stevens served as the director of the Office of Multilateral Nuclear and Security Affairs, a Pearson Fellow with the Senate Foreign Relations Committee and Senator Richard Lugar, the special assistant to the Undersecretary for Political Affairs, an Iran desk officer, and a staff assistant in the Bureau of Near Eastern Affairs.

He had served in Libya twice previously: as Deputy Chief of Mission from 2007 to 2009, and as Special Representative to the National Transitional Council from March 2011 to November 2011, during the Libyan revolution. He arrived in Tripoli in May 2012 as U.S. Ambassador to Libya.

Stevens spoke English, French, and some Arabic.

2012 benghazi attack deaths

During the 2012 Benghazi attack, a fire was set against the wall of the building used as the U.S. Special Mission to Libya in Benghazi while three Americans were inside—Stevens, Sean Smith, and a security officer. According to U.S. officials, the security officer escaped; the staff found Smith dead. They were unable to locate Stevens before being driven from the building under large arms fire. Shortly after midnight, local civilians found Stevens and brought him to the Benghazi Medical Centre, in a state of cardiac arrest. Medical personnel tried to resuscitate him, but he was pronounced dead at about 2 a.m. local time on September 12, 2012. Later reports suggested that the attack was coordinated and planned, with any protests either coincidental or possibly diversionary. Libyan president Muhammad Magariaf blamed elements of Ansar al-Sharia for the killing, linking them to Al-Qaeda in the Islamic Maghreb. Libyan officials suggested that it might have been a revenge attack mounted by loyalists (of deceased Libyan leader Muammar Gaddafi) who were defeated in the Libyan Civil War the previous year. The doctors who tended to Stevens said that no visible physical wounds were found on his body and that he died from smoke inhalation, making hypoxia the cause of his death. Stevens was 52 years old.

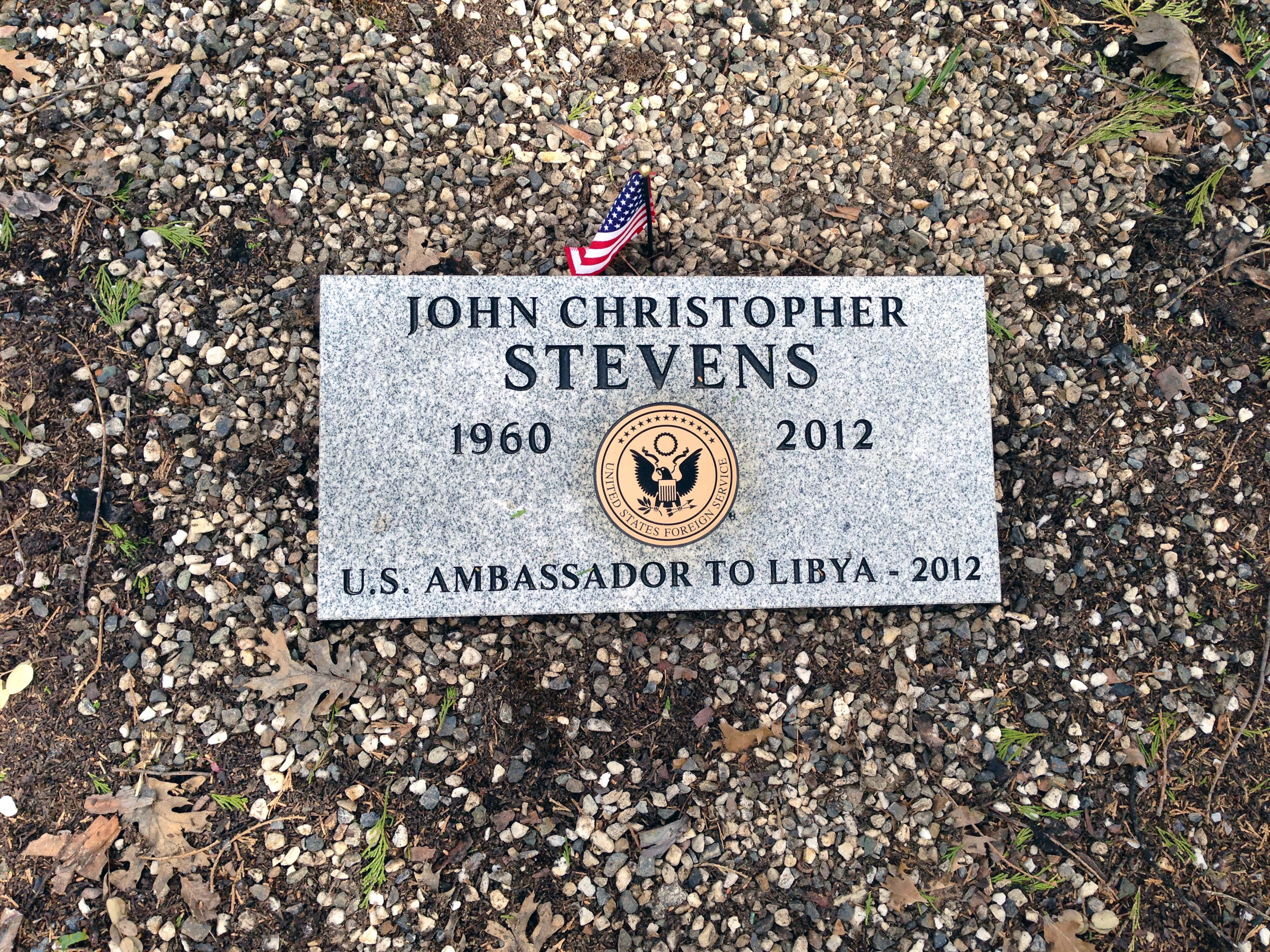
Grave of John Christopher Stevens in Grass Valley, California

The surviving Americans were taken to a safe house. A rescue squad consisting of eight former U.S. military was sent from Tripoli, the capital. They were ambushed and the safe house came under attack. Two more Americans died, including one sent from Tripoli; several were wounded. Later reports identified the victims as Tyrone S. Woods and Glen A. Doherty, both former Navy SEALs working as security and intelligence contractors.

Stevens is buried in New Elm Ridge Cemetery (formerly known as Forester's Cemetery) in Grass Valley, California.

== See also ==
- Arnold Lewis Raphel, the previous U.S. ambassador to die in the line of duty
- Ambassadors of the United States killed in the line of duty
- List of assassinated American politicians
- Notable AFS exchange students

Diplomatic posts
Preceded by Gene Cretz	United States Ambassador to Libya; 2012	Succeeded by Laurence Pope; Acting
