= 13 Hours (book) =

2014 historical book by Mitchell Zuckoff

13 Hours: The Inside Account of What Really Happened in Benghazi
- Author: Mitchell Zuckoff with the Annex Security Team
- Language: English
- Subject: Counter-terrorism
- Genre: Non-fiction
- Publisher: Twelve
- Publication date: September 9, 2014
- Publication place: United States
- Media type: Print (hardcover)
- Pages: 352
- ISBN: 9781455582273
- OCLC: 882187556
- Dewey Decimal: 363.32509 (Alameda County Library)

13 Hours: The Inside Account of What Really Happened in Benghazi is a 2014 historical book by American author Mitchell Zuckoff that depicts the terrorist attack by Islamist militants at the American diplomatic compound in Benghazi, Libya on September 11, 2012. The book is an account from the point of view of the compound's defenders and does not address any of the political controversy surrounding the attacks.

== Reception ==
Karen DeYoung of The Washington Post stated, "Like other recent bestsellers of the Special Operations genre — "Lone Survivor," about a Navy SEAL mission in Afghanistan, or "No Easy Day," about the raid that killed Osama bin Laden — "13 Hours" is an action story that does not dwell on matters of U.S. foreign or security policy, or even the specific cauldron of Libya. Roman Augustoviz of Star Tribune wrote, "'13 Hours' is a jarring narrative at times, but well-flowing. It dwells mostly on the six security operators, who they were, how they prepared for their jobs and how they reacted in a crisis and depended on one another." Glenn C. Altschuler of The Boston Globe commented, "Zuckoff focuses on the Benghazi security men... 13 Hours is a suspenseful (and often violent) account of their competence and courage, written with the hope that their actions will be "understood on their own terms, outside of partisan or political interests."

== Film ==
In 2016, the book was adapted into a major feature film directed by Michael Bay and starring James Badge Dale, John Krasinski, and Max Martini. The film received mixed reviews based on its perceived political stance, but nevertheless grossed a total of $69.4 million worldwide against a production budget of $50 million.

== See also ==
- Counterterrorism Center
- Lone Survivor: The Eyewitness Account of Operation Redwing and the Lost Heroes of SEAL Team 10 (2007), a similarly themed book written by Marcus Luttrell.
