= Sean Smith (diplomat) =

American diplomat and information management officer (1978–2012)

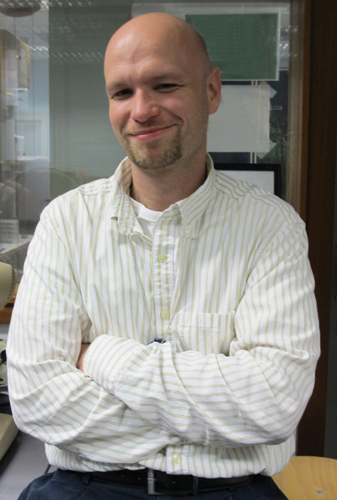
- Born: January 30, 1978; San Diego, California, US
- Died: September 11, 2012 (aged 34); Benghazi, Libya
- Cause of death: Assassinated during 2012 Benghazi attack
- Occupation: Information Management Officer
- Years active: 2002–2012
- Employer: United States Foreign Service
- Known for: Victim of the U.S. Consulate attack in Benghazi; Moderator of Something Awful Forums; Former member of the Council of Stellar Management in the MMO Eve Online
- Spouse: Heather Smith
- Children: 2
- Military career
- Branch: United States Air Force
- Service years: 1995–2002
- Rank: Staff Sergeant

Sean Patrick Smith (January 30, 1978 – September 11, 2012) was an American diplomat and information management officer with the United States Foreign Service who was killed during the September 11, 2012, attack on the U.S. consulate in Benghazi, Libya.

== Life and work ==
Smith was an only child and grew up in the Clairemont neighborhood of San Diego, California. He graduated from Mission Bay High School in 1995, enlisted in the United States Air Force in July 1995 and served for six years. He was a ground radio maintenance (2E1X3) specialist and was promoted to staff sergeant in August 2000. He completed his military service in 2002. As a Foreign Service employee, he lived in The Hague, Netherlands, with his wife, Heather, and children, Samantha and Nathan.

Smith was a leading player and member of the Council of Stellar Management in the Eve Online gaming community (as "Vile rat") and was a moderator on the Something Awful forums (as "Vilerat").

== Death and legacy ==
Smith was one of four Americans killed in the Benghazi attack. He was posthumously awarded the U.S. Department of State's Thomas Jefferson Star for Foreign Service on May 3, 2013. On the day of his death, Smith typed a message to the director of his Eve Online gaming corporation that read, "Assuming we don't die tonight. We saw one of our 'police' that guard the compound taking pictures."

Spontaneous reactions from the Eve Online player base included a mass renaming of outposts throughout its universe. The game's Council of Stellar Management published a tribute to Smith two days after his death. Zack Parsons on the Something Awful forums organized a benefit for Smith's family, raising US$127,000.

In the movie 13 Hours: The Secret Soldiers of Benghazi, which dramatizes the events of the Benghazi attack, Smith was played by actor Christopher Dingli.

== See also ==
- Ansar al-Sharia (Libya) – Salafist jihadist group in Libya
- First Libyan Civil War – Armed conflict in North Africa
