= List of people from Gainesville, Florida =

Notable people who live or have lived in Gainesville, Florida include:

== Individuals ==
=== Musicians ===
- Charles Bradley, singer
- Beverly Crawford, gospel singer-songwriter
- Tay Dizm, musician
- Don Felder, musician
- Laura Jane Grace, musician
- Meklit Hadero, Ethiopia-born American singer
- Gladys Horton, singer for The Marvelettes
- Jeremy Hunter, ska musician and YouTuber
- Timothy Kirkpatrick, drummer
- Bernie Leadon, musician
- Stan Lynch, musician
- Linda Lyndell, singer
- Vivek Maddala, musician, composer
- Marce, musician
- Jeremy McKinnon, singer-songwriter
- Sean Momberger, music producer
- Damien Moyal, singer
- Tom Petty, musician
- Rain Phoenix, actress, musician, and singer
- Chuck Ragan, singer-songwriter
- Minnie Riperton, musician
- Joseph Simmons, musician
- Kaleb Stewart, singer-songwriter
- Stephen Stills, musician
- Benmont Tench, musician
- John Vanderslice, musician
- Chris Wollard, singer-songwriter, musician

=== Actors, performers ===
- Merritt Butrick, actor
- Casey Calvert, actress
- Brittany Daniel, actress
- Cynthia Daniel, actress
- Malcolm Gets
- Darrell Hammond, comedian
- Robert Hoffman, actor
- Tom Miller, performance artist
- Joaquin Phoenix, actor
- River Phoenix, actor
- Stephen Root, actor
- Maya Rudolph, actress, comedian
- Tyra Sanchez, drag queen, reality television personality
- Thomas Sanders, actor, singer and Vine & YouTube comedian

=== Athletes ===
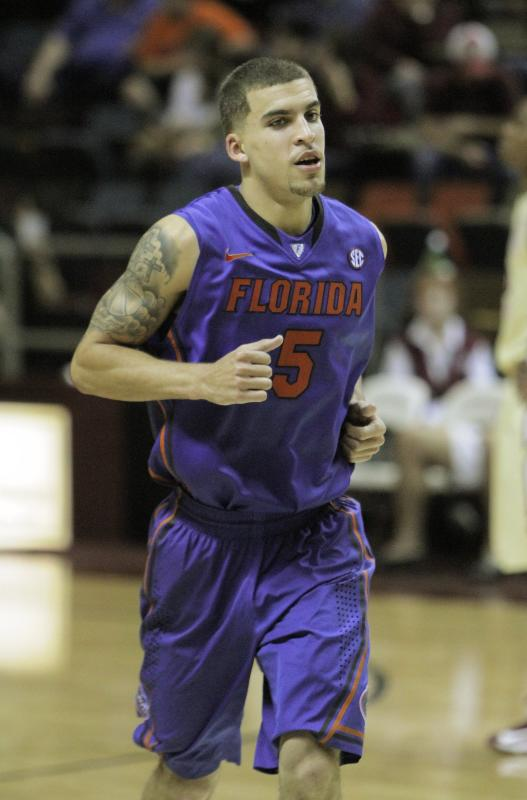
Scottie Wilbekin

- Kenny Bynum, football player (San Diego Chargers)
- Lyubov Denisova, marathon runner
- Doug Dickey, football coach, Hall of Fame member (University of Florida, University of Tennessee)
- Chris Doering, football player, NFL, and ESPN Analyst
- Joel Embiid, basketball player, NBA (Philadelphia 76ers)
- Taurean Green, basketball player, NBA (Denver Nuggets)
- Nigel Harris, football player (Tampa Bay Buccaneers)
- Udonis Haslem, basketball player, NBA (Miami Heat)
- Clay Helton, football head coach, University of Southern California
- Al Horford, basketball player, NBA (Boston Celtics)
- Morgan Hurd, world champion artistic gymnast
- Darrell Jackson, football player, NFL (Seattle Seahawks, San Francisco 49ers)
- Chris Leak, football player, NFL (Chicago Bears)
- Marty Liquori, Olympic track athlete, TV announcer, jazz guitarist
- Ryan Lochte, Olympic swimmer
- Noah Lyles (born 1997), 100/200m runner - olympic bronze medalist and world champion
- Roger Maris, baseball player (Kansas City Athletics, New York Yankees)
- Vernon Maxwell, basketball player (Houston Rockets)
- Andrew Miller, baseball player (Detroit Tigers)
- Heather Mitts, soccer player (United States women's national soccer team)
- Rodney Mullen, professional skateboarder
- Clinton Portis, football player, NFL (Denver Broncos, Washington Redskins)
- Chris Richard, basketball player, NBA (Minnesota Timberwolves)
- Phoenix Sanders (born 1995), baseball pitcher in the San Francisco Giants organization
- Ian Scott, professional football player, NFL (Chicago Bears, Philadelphia Eagles, Carolina Panthers, San Diego Chargers)
- Ben Shelton, professional tennis player
- Emmitt Smith, professional football player, NFL (Dallas Cowboys, Arizona Cardinals)
- Steve Spurrier, football player and coach (University of Florida, Washington Redskins, and University of South Carolina)
- Steve Tannen, NFL defensive back with the New York Jets (1970, first round pick)
- Tim Tebow, professional football player, NFL (Denver Broncos, New York Jets, New England Patriots)
- Chris Thompson, football player
- Abby Wambach, soccer player, United States women's national soccer team
- Scottie Wilbekin (born 1993), Turkish-American basketball player in the Turkish Basketbol Süper Ligi, playing for Fenerbahçe S.K.
- Bernard Williams, sprinter and Olympic gold medalist
- Jordan Williams, NFL player (New York Giants)

=== Writers ===
- Joel Achenbach, newspaper staff writer and book author
- Kiki Carter, environmental activist, organizer, musician, writer
- Harry Crews, Southern Gothic author
- Nancy Yi Fan, children's book author
- Lauren Groff, novelist and short story author
- Joe Haldeman, science fiction author
- Rebecca Heflin, romance novelist
- Andrew Knowlton, food writer
- David Leavitt, author, editor, and English professor at UF
- Tom Meek, newspaper columnist and writer
- Ange Mlinko, poet, critic, editor, and tenured poetry professor at UF
- Michael S. Okun, neurologist who has authored several best-selling books on movement disorders
- Sidney Wade, award-winning poet and Professor Emerita at the University of Florida

=== Other notable individuals ===
- Stephan P. Mickle first African American federal Judge in Gainesville
- Mark Adler, renowned software engineer and planetary scientist
- John Vincent Atanasoff, cited as the inventor of the first electronic digital computer
- Mark Atkinson, highly cited academic and leading figure in type 1 diabetes research
- Anthony James Barr, programming language designer (SAS), software engineer, inventor, and businessman
- Christopher Benninger, American Indian architect who grew up in Gainesville
- Gus Bilirakis, U.S. representative for Florida
- Robert Cade, inventor of Gatorade
- Scott Camil, activist
- Kat Cammack, U.S. representative for Florida
- George Casella (1951-2012), Distinguished Professor in the Department of Statistics at the University of Florida
- David A. Christian, retired United States Army captain and former candidate for the Republican nomination in the 2012 United States Senate election in Pennsylvania
- Sadie Darnell, sheriff of Alachua County 2006–2021
- Jamie Dupree, radio news reporter and Washington correspondent
- Will Frazer, former coach of the Buchholz High School math team and current director of the Frazer School in Gainesville
- Jesse James Garrett, user experience designer who coined the term Ajax (Asynchronous JavaScript and XML)
- Jarvis Johnson, YouTuber and former software engineer
- Terry Jones, gained national and international attention in 2010 for his plan to burn Qur'ans
- Gillian Lord, professor of Spanish and linguistics; associate dean for student affairs at the University of Florida
- William R. Maples, forensic anthropologist
- Dustin Moskovitz, co-founder of Facebook and Asana
- Howard Thomas Odum (1924–2002), ecologist
- Charles R. Perry, philanthropist and businessman
- Scott Ritter, former United Nations weapons inspector and convicted sex offender
- Gabriel Schwartzman, chess Grandmaster, winner of the 1996 U.S. Open, who started the world's first interactive chess school
- Craig Silverstein, cited as the first employee of Google
- Maggie Taylor, artist
- John Thompson, mathematician, Fields medalist
- Jerry Uelsmann, fine art photographer
- Blake R. Van Leer, university president, dean of University of Florida, inventor, civil rights advocate
- Bob Vila, home improvement television show host
- Harvey Ward, mayor of Gainesville January 2023–present
- Andrew H. Warren, former state attorney for Florida's 13th judicial circuit
- Edward Yang, film director

== Music groups ==
- Against Me!
- Aleka's Attic
- As Friends Rust
- Cyne
- Damien Done
- The Draft
- For Squirrels
- Holopaw
- Hot Water Music
- Less Than Jake
- Mudcrutch
- Rehasher
- Sister Hazel
- Tom Petty and the Heartbreakers (spinoff from Mudcrutch)
