= 2010 Gainesville mayoral election =

2010 Gainesville, Florida mayoral election
- March 16, 2010; April 13, 2010
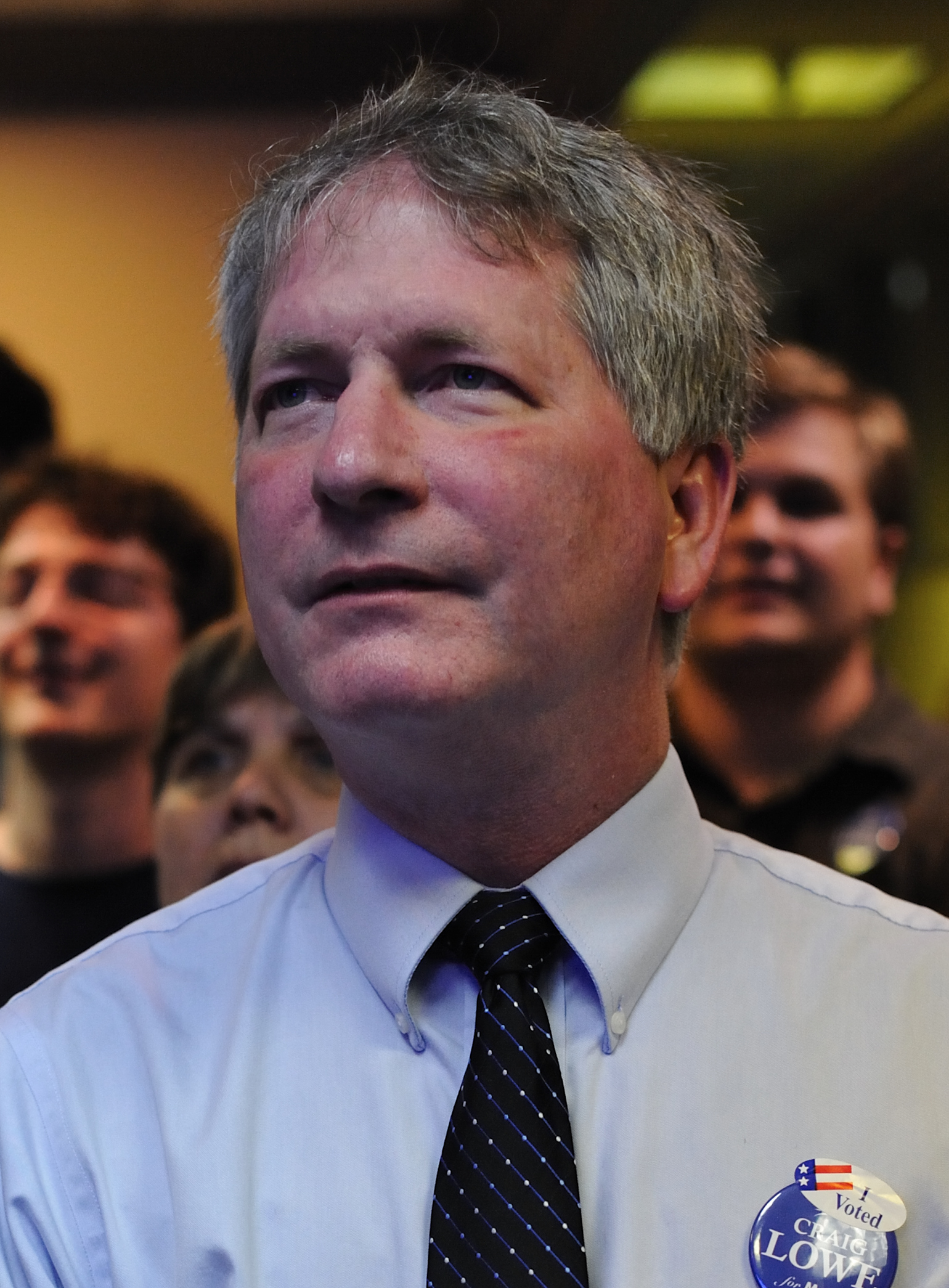

Candidate	Craig Lowe	Don Marsh	Monica Leadon Cooper
First round	4,078; 40.13%	2,960; 29.13%	2,529; 24.89%
Runoff	6,110; 50.17%	6,068; 49.83%	Eliminated
Mayor before election
Pegeen Hanrahan
Nonpartisan
Elected Mayor
Craig Lowe
Nonpartisan

The 2010 Gainesville, Florida mayoral election took place on April 13, 2010, following a primary on March 16, 2010. Incumbent Mayor Pegeen Hanrahan was term-limited and unable to seek a third consecutive term. City Commissioner Craig Lowe placed first in the primary election, winning 40 percent of the vote. Businessman Don Marsh, a former Republican candidate for County Commission, placed second over businesswoman Monica Leadon Cooper, 29–25 percent, and advanced to the general election.

Lowe narrowly defeated Marsh, winning 50.2 percent of the vote to Marsh's 49.8 percent, a margin of just 42 votes. Marsh requested a recount, which ultimately affirmed Lowe's victory.

== Primary election ==
=== Candidates ===
- Craig Lowe, City Commissioner
- Don Marsh, businessman, 2002 Republican candidate for County Commission
- Monica Leadon Cooper, businesswoman, former member of the Gainesville Development Review Board
- Richard Selwach, jewelry store owner
- Ozzy Angulo, food services employee

=== Results ===
Primary election results
Party	Candidate	Votes	%
Nonpartisan	Craig Lowe	4,078	40.13%
Nonpartisan	Don Marsh	2,960	29.13%
Nonpartisan	Monica Leadon Cooper	2,529	24.89%
Nonpartisan	Richard Selwach	442	4.35%
Nonpartisan	Ozzy Angulo	153	1.51%
Total votes		10,162	100.00%

== Runoff election ==
=== Results ===
Runoff election results
Party	Candidate	Votes	%
Nonpartisan	Craig Lowe	6,110	50.17%
Nonpartisan	Don Marsh	6,068	49.83%
Total votes		12,178	100.00%
