= 2016 Gainesville mayoral election =

- March 15, 2016
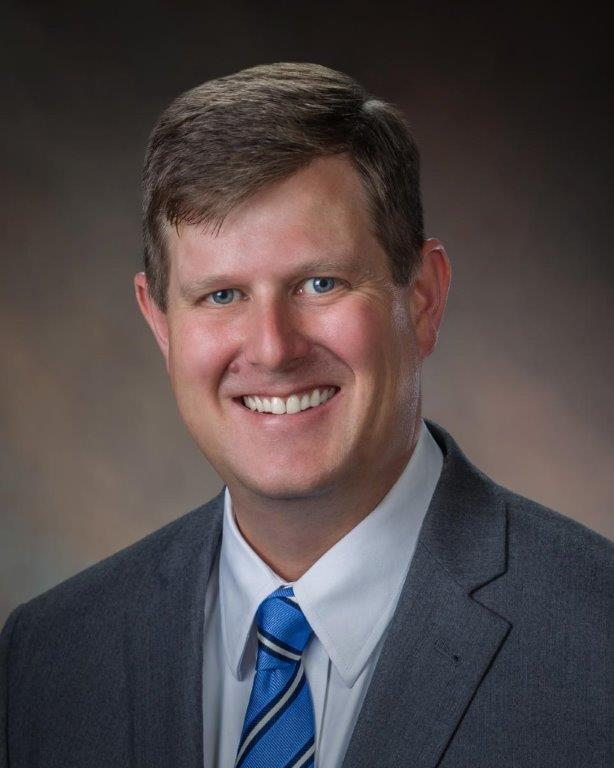

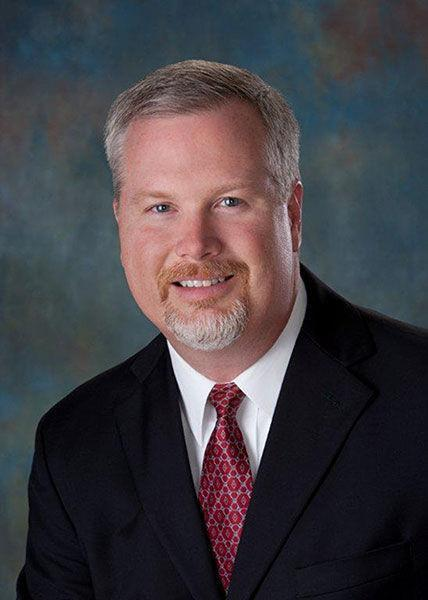
Candidate	Lauren Poe	Ed Braddy
Party	Nonpartisan	Nonpartisan
Popular vote	16,384	11,331
Percentage	57.05%	39.46%
- Precinct results Poe: 50–60% 60–70% 70–80% Brady: 50–60% >90% No votes
Mayor before election
Ed Braddy
Nonpartisan
Elected Mayor
Lauren Poe
Nonpartisan

The 2016 Gainesville, Florida mayoral election took place on March 15, 2016. Incumbent Mayor Ed Braddy ran for re-election to a second term. He was challenged by former City Commissioner Lauren Poe, a professor at Santa Fe College. Though the race was officially nonpartisan, Poe, a Democrat, received support from the Florida Democratic Party and benefited from high turnout in the presidential primary, while Braddy, a Republican, avoided partisan labels. Poe ultimately defeated Braddy in a landslide, receiving 57 percent of the vote to Braddy's 39 percent.

== Primary election ==
=== Candidates ===
- Lauren Poe, former City Commissioner, professor at Santa Fe College
- Ed Braddy, incumbent Mayor
- Donald Shepherd Sr., former University of Florida groundskeeper, 2013 candidate for Mayor

=== Results ===
Primary election results
Party	Candidate	Votes	%
Nonpartisan	Lauren Poe	16,384	57.05%
Nonpartisan	Ed Braddy (inc.)	11,331	39.46%
Nonpartisan	Donald Shepherd Sr.	1,002	3.49%
Total votes		28,717	100.00%
