= 2022 Gainesville mayoral election =

- August 23, 2022; November 8, 2022
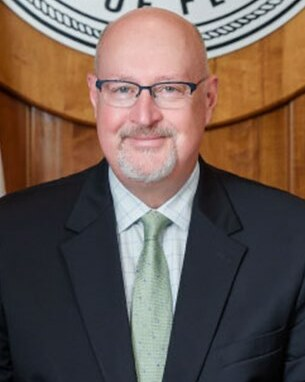

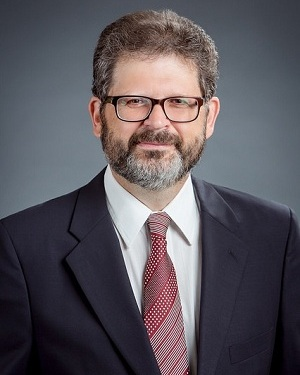

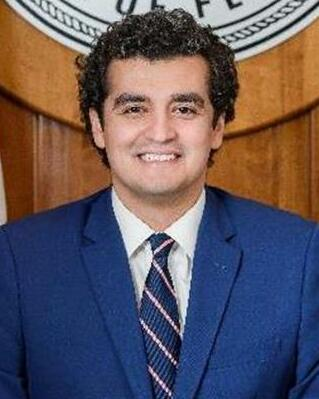

Candidate	Harvey Ward	Ed Bielarski	David Arreola
First round	5,889; 27.94%	5,570; 26.43%	3,242; 15.38%
Runoff	20,420; 57.60%	15,030; 42.40%	Eliminated
Candidate	Gary Gordon	July Thomas
First round	3,044; 14.44%	2,119; 10.06%
Runoff	Eliminated	Eliminated
- Ward: <30% 30–40% 50–60% 60–70% 70–80% Bielarski: <30% 30–40% 40–50% 50–60% 70–80% Arreola: <30% 30–40% 40–50% Thomas: <30% No votes
Mayor before election
Lauren Poe
Nonpartisan
Elected Mayor
Harvey Ward
Nonpartisan

The 2022 Gainesville, Florida mayoral election took place on November 8, 2022, following a primary election on August 23, 2022. Incumbent Mayor Lauren Poe was term-limited and could not seek a third consecutive term. A crowded field emerged to succeed him. City Commissioner Harvey Ward and Ed Bielarski, the former general manager of the Gainesville Regional Utilities, placed first and second in the primary election with 28 and 26 percent, respectively. In the general election, Ward defeated Bielarski in a landslide, winning 58 percent of the vote to Bielarski's 42 percent.

Following an amendment to the city charter, this was the first election to take place on a consolidated schedule with statewide elections and Ward was the first Mayor elected to a four-year term.

== Primary election ==
=== Candidates ===
- Harvey Ward, City Commissioner
- Ed Bielarski, former Gainesville Regional Utilities general manager
- David Arreola, City Commissioner
- Gary Gordon, former Mayor
- July Thomas, University of Florida astrophysics graduate student
- Ansaun J. Fisher, owner of the Florida Allstars basketball team
- Gabriel Hillel, disbarred civil rights attorney
- Donald E. Shepherd Sr., perennial candidate, former University of Florida groundskeeper
- Adam Rosenthal, tech worker

=== Results ===
Primary election results
Party	Candidate	Votes	%
Nonpartisan	Harvey Ward	5,889	27.94%
Nonpartisan	Ed Bielarski	5,570	26.43%
Nonpartisan	David Arreola	3,242	15.38%
Nonpartisan	Gary Gordon	3,044	14.44%
Nonpartisan	July Thomas	2,119	10.06%
Nonpartisan	Ansaun J. Fisher	449	2.13%
Nonpartisan	Gabriel Hillel	273	1.30%
Nonpartisan	Donald E. Shepherd Sr.	252	1.20%
Nonpartisan	Adam Rosenthal	236	1.12%
Total votes		21,074	100.00%

== Runoff election ==
=== Results ===
Runoff election results
Party	Candidate	Votes	%
Nonpartisan	Harvey Ward	20,420	57.60%
Nonpartisan	Ed Bielarski	15,030	42.40%
Total votes		35,450	100.00%
