= 2019 Gainesville mayoral election =

- March 19, 2019
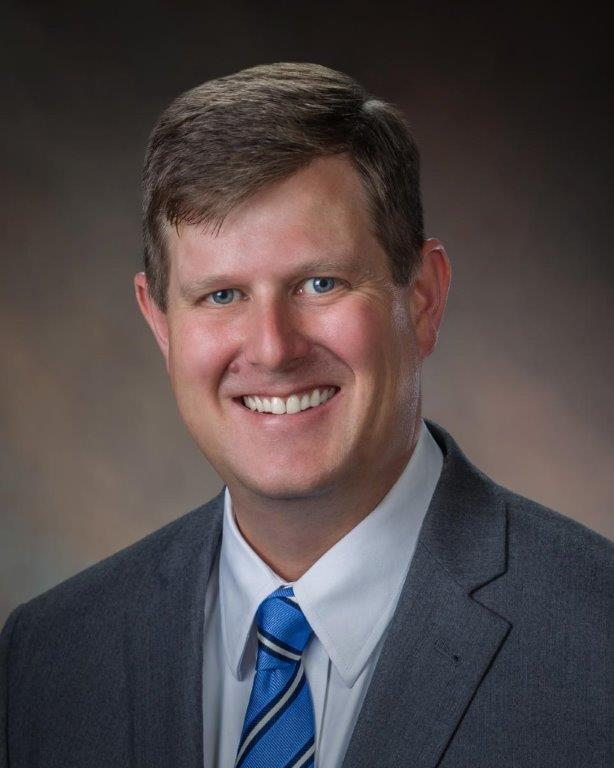

Candidate	Lauren Poe	Jenn Powell	Jennifer Reid
Party	Nonpartisan	Nonpartisan	Nonpartisan
Popular vote	7,163	2,139	1,806
Percentage	61.82%	18.46%	15.59%
- Precinct results Poe: 40–50% 50–60% 60–70% 70–80% 80–90% Reid: >90% No votes
Mayor before election
Lauren Poe
Nonpartisan
Elected Mayor
Lauren Poe
Nonpartisan

The 2019 Gainesville, Florida mayoral election took place on March 19, 2019. Incumbent Mayor Lauren Poe ran for re-election to a second term. He was challenged by three candidates: community activist Jenn Powell, legal assistant Jennifer Reid, and community college student Marlon Bruce. Poe won re-election in a landslide, winning 62 percent of the vote.

Following an amendment to the city charter, this was the last election to take place in an odd-numbered year and the last election for a three-year term.

== Primary election ==
=== Candidates ===
- Lauren Poe, incumbent Mayor
- Jenn Powell, 2017 candidate for City Commission, member of the City Affordable Housing Advisory Committee
- Jennifer Reid, legal assistant
- Marlon Bruce, Santa Fe College student

=== Results ===
Primary election results
Party	Candidate	Votes	%
Nonpartisan	Lauren Poe (inc.)	7,163	61.82%
Nonpartisan	Jenn Powell	2,139	18.46%
Nonpartisan	Jennifer Reid	1,806	15.59%
Nonpartisan	Marlon Bruce	478	4.13%
Total votes		11,586	100.00%
