= 2013 Gainesville mayoral election =

- March 19, 2013; April 16, 2013
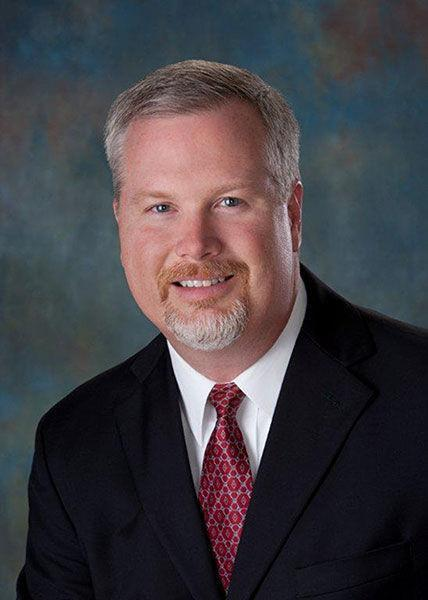

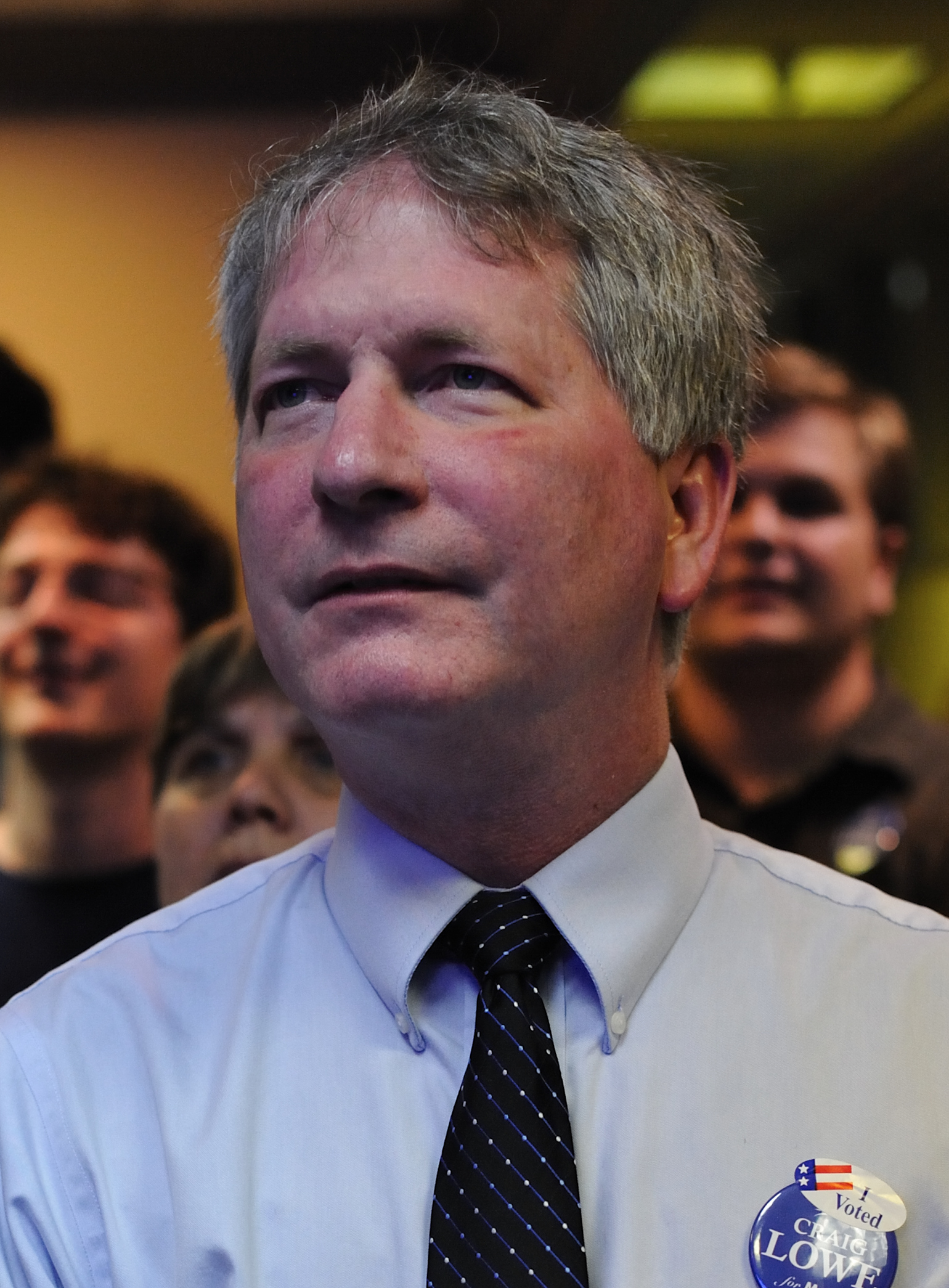

Candidate	Ed Braddy	Craig Lowe
First round	4,649; 38.44%	4,418; 36.53%
Runoff	7,627; 54.73%	6,011; 45.27%
Candidate	Scherwin L. Henry	Pete Johnson
First round	2,058; 17.02%	787; 6.51%
Runoff	Eliminated	Eliminated
- Precinct results Brady: 40–50% 50–60% 60–70% 70–80% Lowe: 30–40% 40–50% 50–60% 60–70% 70–80% Henry: 40–50% 50–60% 80–90% No votes
Mayor before election
Craig Lowe
Nonpartisan
Elected Mayor
Ed Braddy
Nonpartisan

The 2013 Gainesville, Florida mayoral election took place on April 16, 2013, following a primary election on March 19, 2013. Incumbent Mayor Craig Lowe ran for re-election to a second term. He was challenged by five opponents, including former City Commissioners Ed Braddy and Scherwin Henry. In the primary election, Braddy narrowly placed first over Lowe, winning 38 percent of the vote to Lowe's 37 percent, so both candidates advanced to the general election.

Shortly after the primary, Lowe was arrested for driving under the influence and leaving the scene of an accident. Lowe apologized for his actions and pledged to continue his campaign, but he was defeated by Braddy by a wide margin, 55–45 percent.

== Primary election ==
=== Candidates ===
- Ed Braddy, former City Commissioner
- Craig Lowe, incumbent Mayor
- Scherwin L. Henry, former City Commissioner
- Pete Johnson, member of the City Plan Board
- Mark Venzke, former City Commission candidate
- Donald Shepherd Sr., former University of Florida groundskeeper

=== Results ===
Primary election results
Party	Candidate	Votes	%
Nonpartisan	Ed Braddy	4,649	38.44%
Nonpartisan	Craig Lowe (inc.)	4,418	36.53%
Nonpartisan	Scherwin L. Henry	2,058	17.02%
Nonpartisan	Pete Johnson	787	6.51%
Nonpartisan	Mark Venzke	128	1.06%
Nonpartisan	Donald Shepherd Sr.	54	0.45%
Total votes		12,094	100.00%

== Runoff election ==
=== Results ===
Runoff election results
Party	Candidate	Votes	%
Nonpartisan	Ed Braddy	7,267	54.73%
Nonpartisan	Craig Lowe (inc.)	6,011	45.27%
Total votes		13,278	100.00%
