= Dove World Outreach Center =

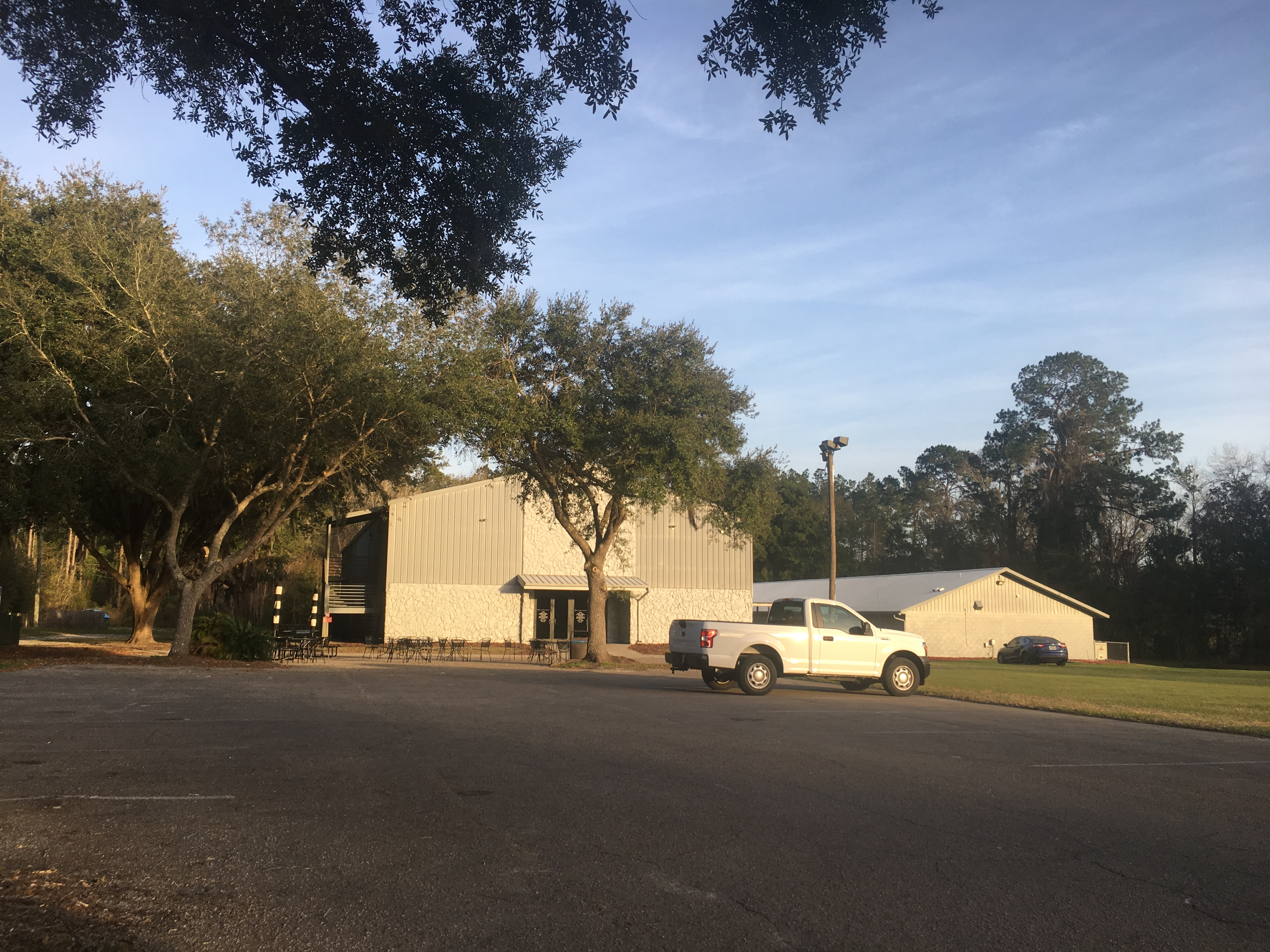
- Former Dove World Outreach Center building, January 2020

- Location within Florida
- 29°42′28″N 82°22′38″W
- Location: Gainesville, Florida
- Country: United States
- Denomination: Non-denominational

History
- Founded: September 1986
- Founder(s): Donald and Delores Northrup
- Dedicated: February 1988

Architecture
- Closed: September 2013

Dove World Outreach Center was a 50-member (as of 2010) non-denominational charismatic Christian church led by pastor Terry Jones and his wife, Sylvia. After spending more than 25 years in Gainesville, Florida, the church sold its 20 acres (8 ha) of property in July 2013 with plans to relocate to Tampa. The church first gained notice during the late 2000s for its public displays and criticism of Islam and gay people, and was designated as a hate group by the Southern Poverty Law Center. It became widely known for its pastor's controversial plan to burn Qur'ans on the ninth anniversary of the September 11 attacks.

On September 11, 2010, Jones announced his church would never be burning Qur'ans and that he had reached his goal of exposing elements of Islam as dangerous and radical. On March 20, 2011, however, Jones carried through on his threat, and burned a Qur'an. On April 1, 2011, in protest of the burning, protesters in the northern Afghanistan city of Mazar-i-Sharif, attacked a United Nations Assistance Mission, killing at least 12 people, including at least 7 U.N. workers. Jones described Islam as a false religion that will lead people to hell, and urged to Muslims that the Bible is the only way to God. The congregation held rallies against Gainesville mayor Craig Lowe for being openly gay, and his staff for their purported liberal policies.

A Dove World congregation also held a protest against the building of Park51. After Obama's endorsement of gay marriage, the church hanged an Obama effigy with a rainbow flag on its lawn.

In 2017, Terry Jones was reported to have worked as a driver for Uber, but was removed by the company after a report accusing him of sharing anti-Islamic messages with passengers.

== History and organization ==
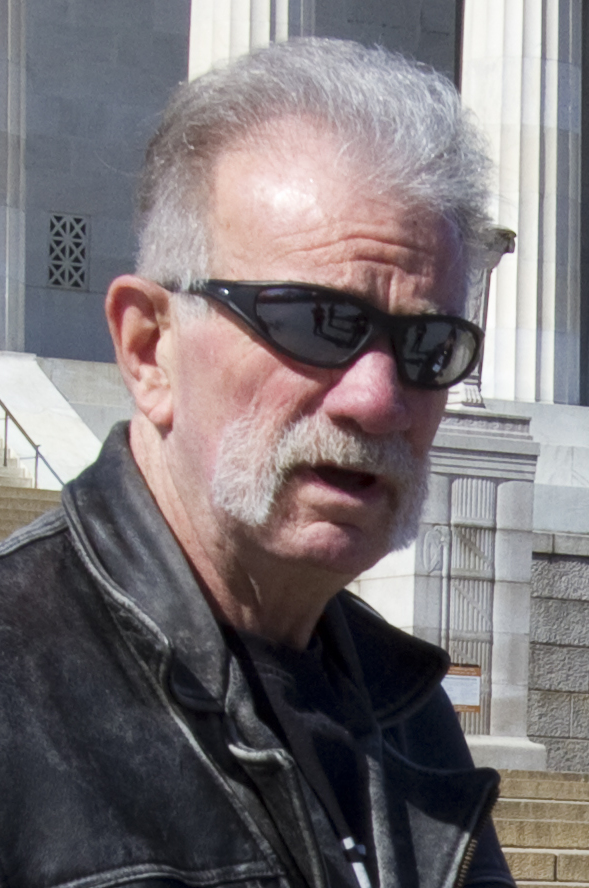
Pastor Terry Jones

The Dove World Outreach Center was founded in 1985 by Donald O. Northrup, and his wife, Delores, Richard H. Wright was another early pastor. Northrup remained with Dove World from its inception until he died in 1996. Dennis Watson then took over as pastor, with Northrop's wife, Delores, continuing as Woman's Pastor until 2004.

Between 2001 and 2008, Jones and his wife served as the part-time pastors of the Florida church, and as heads of a church in Cologne, Germany; by 2004 they were senior part-time pastors of Dove World, shuttling back and forth to Germany. Terry Jones assumed full-time duties at Dove World in 2008 after his German church was closed. Delores Northrup subsequently left Dove World, telling a reporter who contacted her regarding Jones' 2010 proposed Koran burning, "I was not happy with the program. I think this is completely wrong".

In 2004, when Jones took over as senior pastor of Dove World, it had approximately 100 members; by September 2010 it was said to have 50 members, with about 30 members reportedly attending services. As of September 2010, Wayne Sapp was serving as assistant pastor, with Jones' son serving as youth minister.

Terry Jones was invited to a rally in Luton in February 2011 to share his views on Islamic extremism. Anti-fascist group Hope not Hate successfully petitioned the Home Secretary to have Jones banned from entering the UK.

German media reported on September 17, 2012, that Terry Jones would be barred from entering Germany if he traveled there. Jones was invited by the group Pro Deutschland to an event in Berlin. A spokesman for the Interior Ministry said that a visit by Jones would "run counter to the interest of maintaining public order."

== Buildings and property ==
In addition to the church, the Dove World Outreach Center maintained a school, called the "Dove World Outreach Academy". According to the Gainesville Sun, the academy had a bootcamp-like atmosphere. Students are prohibited from outside and family contact, including attendance at family weddings and funerals. They reportedly worked without compensation, selling, packing, and shipping furniture for TS and Company.

Tuition for the six-month semester was $500. The church maintains a partial tax exemption for its non-profit activities, but has been assessed some $3,100 per year in property taxes for using a portion of its property to conduct a for-profit business, TS and Company.

Jones told The New York Times in September 2010 that following his July 2010 announcement of the book-burning event, the bank, RBC (Royal Bank of Canada) which held a $140,000 mortgage loan on the church demanded immediate repayment of the balance and Jones had his property insurance canceled. In March 2013 it was reported that Dove World Outreach Center will relocate to the Tampa Bay area.

== Anti-gay and other activities ==
The Dove World Outreach Center is considered a hate group by the Southern Poverty Law Center, first making the list for its anti-gay activities. In March 2010, Dove World posted a video which decried the possibility of an openly gay mayor of Gainesville, and a lawn sign saying, "No Homo Mayor". The church changed the sign to simply read "No Homo" after Americans United requested the Internal Revenue Service to investigate the sign as an undue participation of a tax-exempt church in the political process.

In April 2010 church members participated in a joint protest against homosexuality with the Westboro Baptist Church, a group known for disrupting the funerals of U.S. soldiers. Church member Fran Ingram posted an article on the church's website affirming the church's endorsements of the Westboro Baptist Church's protests against homosexuality but stated that "[w]e do not agree with all of Westboro's methods".

=== "No Homo Mayor" protest ===
Gainesville mayor Craig Lowe was subjected to a week-long fringe demonstration with signs reading "No Homo Mayor". During the mayoral run-off elections against Don Marsh, Lowe and his staff were harassed for their progressive views by pastor Wayne Sapp, with fliers, mailers and online slurs. Jones has also rallied against abortion in the past.

== Anti-Islam activities ==
=== Lawn signs and t-shirts ===
In 2009, Dove World posted a lawn sign which stated in large red letters "Islam is of the Devil", (and which later became the title of a book published by Jones in 2010).

The signs drew protests and picketing by local activists and the Council on American-Islamic Relations (CAIR). CAIR responded to another sign which read, "Koran 9:5 Kill the disbelievers wherever you find them." saying the quote was out of context, and aimed at antagonizing Muslims.

In August 2009, several children of church members went to their public schools wearing T-shirts reading "Islam is of the Devil" on the back and were sent home for violating the school district's dress code. The ACLU challenged the constitutionality of policies or practices which permit school administrators to ban any messages on clothing which they find “offensive to others” and which permit school administrators to allow messages which they determine to be “positive” while banning messages they determine to be “negative.”

According to the Dove World Outreach Center's web site the school is now permitting only plain or blank T-shirts to be worn by students. Legal experts said the policy was likely legal and did not violate the First Amendment. Jones said he had had the T-shirts printed by an internet company because local companies did not have the "guts" to print them.

=== 2010 "International Burn a Koran Day" ===
==== Criticism ====
Reactions were widespread ranging from the local level to the international and were largely negative. A sampling of these reactions follows. In August, 2010, Gainesville Mayor Lowe referred to Dove World as a "tiny fringe group and an embarrassment to our community". A Gainesville Interfaith Forum was established in opposition to Dove with participation from the University of Florida Hillel, Congregation Bnai Israel and individual Muslim residents.

Twenty local religious leaders gathered Thursday, September 2, 2010, to call for citizens to rally around Muslims. The Gainesville Interfaith Forum's request for the declaration of September 11 as "Interfaith Solidarity Day" was honored by Gainesville Mayor Craig Lowe, and The Forum scheduled a "Gathering for Peace, Understanding and Hope" for the day before the planned burning.

President Barack Obama called the planned burnings "a recruitment bonanza for Al Qaeda" that could result in serious violence against American troops. David Petraeus, U.S. forces general in Afghanistan, stated that it could endanger troops and the overall effort there and said "it is precisely the kind of action the Taliban uses and could cause significant problems."

U.S. Secretary of State Hillary Clinton said "It is regrettable that a pastor in Gainesville, Florida, with a church of no more than 50 people, can make this outrageous and distrustful, disgraceful plan and get the world's attention". The U.S. embassy in Kabul issued a statement condemning the plans. Robert Gibbs, White House Press Secretary, criticized the plans stating "any type of activity like that that puts our troops in harm's way".

NATO chief Anders Fogh Rasmussen said that the church's plans would violate NATO's "values" and may have a negative impact on the security of its soldiers.

Sarah Palin said the burning would "feed the fire of caustic rhetoric and appear as nothing more than mean-spirited religious intolerance".

Other negative reaction and condemnation came from: the government of Canada, the Anti-Defamation League, Al-Azhar University, the National Association of Evangelicals, the German Evangelical Alliance, the International Humanist and Ethical Union, the Organisation of the Islamic Conference, and many others.

==== Protests ====
Protests ensued against the proposed burning event:

- On August 27, 2010, approximately 100 Indonesians protested outside the U.S. Embassy in Jakarta.
- On September 4, 2010, Indonesians took to the streets to protest, with thousands, mostly Muslims, taking part in events across the country. Rokhmat Labib, chairman of the Islamic group Hizbut Tahrir that organized the protests, called the planned book burning a provocation and predicted that Muslims would fight back should it take place. Lahib said that Muslims must not stay silent when their faith is threatened. The Pluralism Care Movement, a multi-faith group asked for the U.S. government to prevent the burning and for Indonesia to show its tolerance for religious differences.
- On September 6, 2010, hundreds of Afghans had protested in Kabul against the planned Qur'an burning event, chanting "death to America" and throwing rocks at a passing military convoy. Military officials also expressed fears that the protests would spread to other cities. Military officers at the Pentagon consequently said they hoped the rare incursion into politics by a military commander would convince pastor Jones to cancel his plans. Jones said, "We are sure that [General Petraeus'] concerns are legitimate. [Nonetheless] [w]e must send a clear message to the radical element of Islam. We will no longer be controlled and dominated by their fears and threats."

By September 12, 2010, three Afghans had been killed in protests over the Qur'an burning with incitement by the Taliban, anti-Afghan government, anti-American and anti-Jew sentiments contributing to the outrage, according to The New York Times.

==== Outcome ====
In the wake of international condemnation and personal threats, Jones said he would not "back down because of fear." After canceling, then suspending the event in the days immediately preceding September 11, 2010, Jones ultimately said his church would not be carrying out the plan to burn the Korans and that he had attained the goal of exposing the fact that an element of Islam is "very dangerous and very radical". At a press conference Jones said that he planned to move the church to St. Petersburg, Florida as soon as the Gainesville property was sold.

An article dated April 2, 2011 indicates that a recent burning of a Muslim holy book at Dove World Outreach has fueled a second day of deadly violence half a world away in Afghanistan, where demonstrators set cars and shops ablaze Saturday in a riot that killed nine protesters, officials said. Jones said he backed out of the burning because Imam Muhammad Musri deceived him by saying that the proposed ground zero mosque would be relocated.

=== 2011 "International Judge the Quran Day" ===
After the pressure over the "Burn the Qu'ran" controversy had died down, Jones established a new organization, "Stand Up America Now". On March 20, 2011, Jones officiated as judge over a mock trial operated by Stand Up America Now in which the Qu'ran was found "guilty" of a variety of crimes, including "murder, rape, deception, being responsible for terrorist activities all around the world"; over 30 people attended the event, including Ahmed Abaza and other converts from Islam to Christianity testifying against the book and Sheikh Imam Mohammed Hassan, a former candidate in the Sudanese presidential election, 2010 and current Texas-based Sunni cleric, serving as "defense attorney". A copy was then burned on a barbecue grill by Wayne Sapp.

==== Response ====
At first, the response was minor compared to the previous September's "Burn the Qu'ran" episode. Ibrahim Hooper of the Council on American-Islamic Relations said that "Terry Jones had his 15 minutes of fame and we're not going to help him get another few minutes."

Later, protests erupted in Pakistan where the Jamiat-e-Ulema-e-Islam organized a road blockage and burnings of effigies and American flags in the province of Sindh and mobs proceeded to protest against the Punjab neighborhoods of Pakistani Christians.

The leader of the Jamaat-ud-Dawah, Amir Hamza, announced a Rs 10 crore bounty for Jones' murder.

The Iranian Ambassador to the United Nations, Mohammad Khazaee, condemned the burning and called for Jones' prosecution. On April 1, 2011, a mob, inflamed by a mosque sermon describing the burning of the Muslim holy book, attacked a United Nations compound in a northern Afghan city of Mazar-i-Sharif in Afghanistan. A mob of 1000 angry people attacked a U.N. compound. The attack resulted in the killing of Nepalese guards. According to Sherjan Durrani, a spokesman for the provincial police “four rioters had also been killed and that more than 100 others were injured in the outbreak of violence in the northern city, normally one of the calmer corners of Afghanistan.”

President Obama strongly condemned both the Quran burning, calling it an act of "extreme intolerance and bigotry", as well as the "outrageous" attacks by protesters, referring to them as "an affront to human decency and dignity ... No religion tolerates the slaughter and beheading of innocent people, and there is no justification for such a dishonorable and deplorable act." U.S. legislators, including Senate Majority Leader Harry Reid, also condemned both the burning and the violence in reaction to it.

==== Worldwide burning of the Koran and images of the prophet Mohammed: 2012 ====
On February 24, 2012, Pastor Terry Jones released a video on YouTube on which he demanded the Iranian government release a pastor by the name of Youcef Nadarkhani from prison. Nadarkhani is a pastor who had been found guilty for apostasy from Islam, when he left Islam at the age of 19 and converted to Christianity. The Iranian government had used sharia law to sentence Nadarkhani to be executed for apostasy unless he recanted his conversion to Christianity.

=== 2012 International Judge Mohammed Day ===
On September 11, 2012, on the 11-year anniversary of the 9/11 attack, Jones held an event called 'International Judge Mohammed day'. On this day, Jones put the Islamic prophet Mohammed on trial on charges such as rape, being a false prophet and being responsible for the murder of millions of Non-Muslims and minorities. Mohammed was found guilty and Jones proceeded with a burning of a Mohammed action figure and the Koran as well.

As part of the event, Jones promoted a low-budget film critical of Mohammed called 'The Innocence of Muslims'. The Muslim Brotherhood in Egypt have put out an arrest warrant for seven Copt Christians in Canada and America for their alleged involvement in the making of the film, which also led to worldwide riots by Muslims. In March 2013 the al Qaeda English-language magazine Inspire published a poster stating "Wanted dead or alive for crimes against Islam" with a prominent image of Terry Jones.

In Pakistan, protesters set American flags and effigies of Jones on fire, condemning the 9/11 plan, according to an article on April 14, 2013, in The Nation.

== Jones' anti-Obama activities ==
Jones announced a campaign to run for president in October 2011. His campaign name was "Stand Up America Now" and called for deportation of all "illegals". It also involved a continued "stand against radical Islam".

In June 2012, Jones hung an effigy of President Obama in opposition of same-sex marriage, abortion, and "radical Islam", and was then investigated by the Secret Service. Christian Post noted that Jones claimed Obama was "killing America" and lying.

Effigies of Obama and former President Bill Clinton were burned outside the church in January 2013. The City of Gainesville fined Jones $500 for the effigy burning after the rally.

== See also ==
- List of organizations designated by the Southern Poverty Law Center as anti-gay hate groups
