= Harvey Ward =

Harvey Ward may refer to:

- Harvey Ward (director-general), director-general of the Rhodesian Broadcasting Corporation
- Harvey Ward (politician), mayor of Gainesville, Florida
