= Bob Casey (Florida politician) =

American politician (1931–2015)

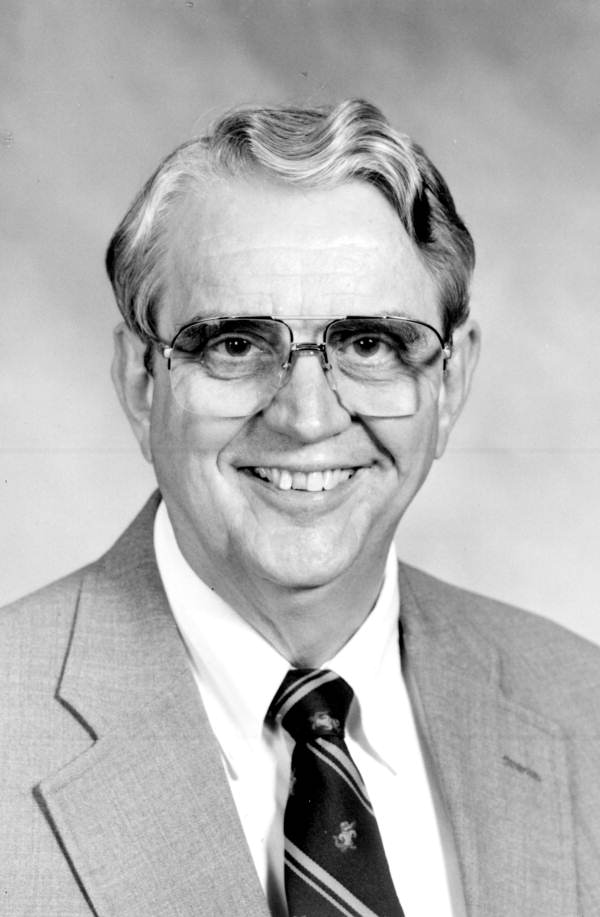

Member of the Florida House of Representatives from the 22nd district
- In office November 3, 1992 – November 7, 2000
- Preceded by: Kelley Smith
- Succeeded by: Perry McGriff

Personal details
- Born: July 22, 1931 Paducah, Kentucky
- Died: June 7, 2015 (aged 83) Gainesville, Florida
- Party: Republican
- Education: Baylor University (B.A.); Southern Baptist Theological Seminary; University of Florida College of Medicine (M.D.)
- Occupation: Physician

Military service
- Allegiance: United States
- Branch/service: United States Marine Corps Reserve

Robert K. Casey (July 22, 1931 – June 7, 2015) was a Republican politician from Florida who served as a member of the Florida House of Representatives from the 22nd district from 1992 to 2000.

Born in Paducah, Kentucky. Casey lived with his family in Gainesville, Florida. Casey served in the United States Marine Corps during the Korean War. He received his bachelor's degree from Baylor University and his medical degree from the University of Florida. Casey served in the Florida House of Representatives from 1992 to 2000 and was a Republican.
