= Clovis Watson Jr. =

American politician (born 1958)

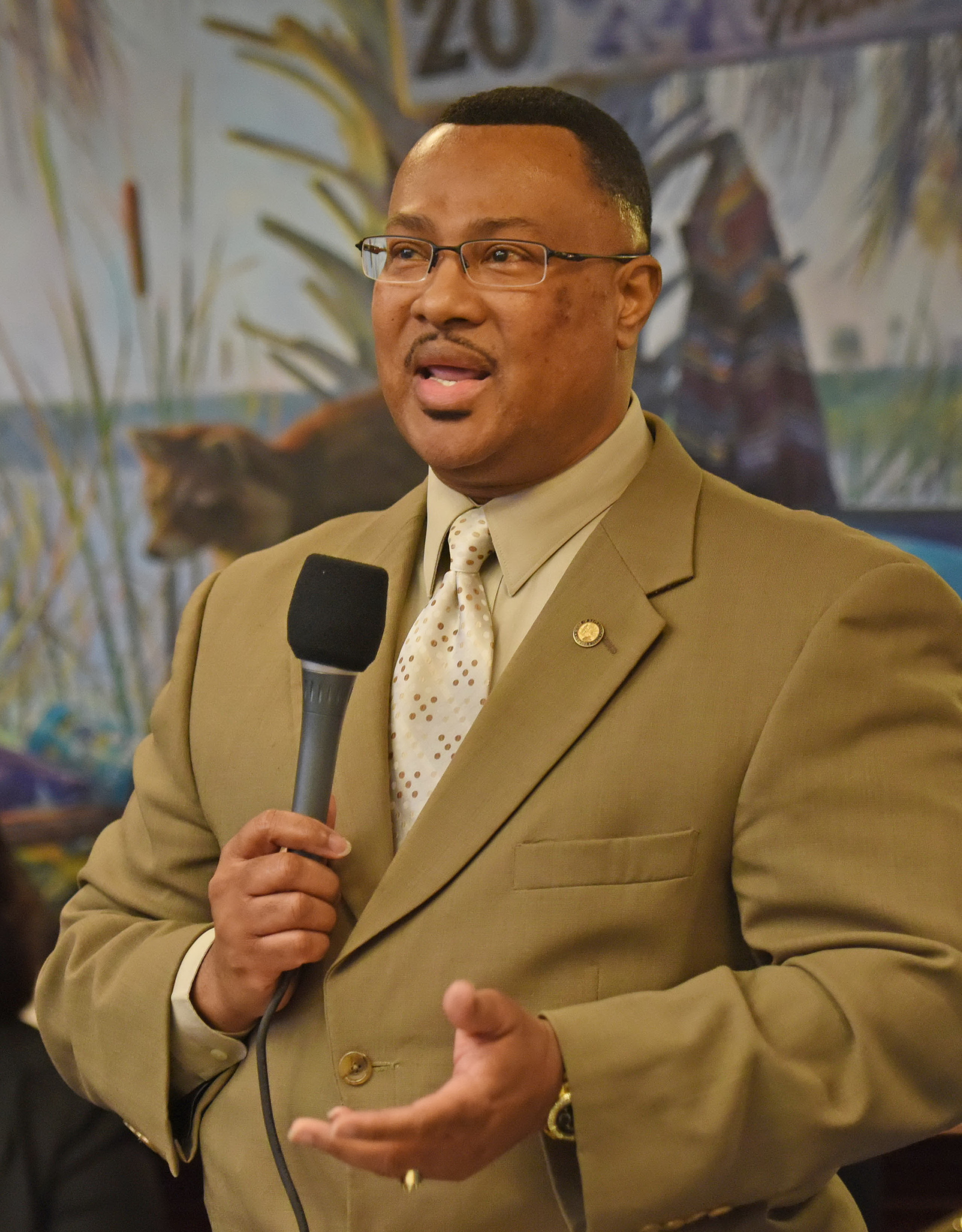

Sheriff of Alachua County, Florida
- In office January 5, 2021 – October 1, 2023
- Preceded by: Sadie Darnell
- Succeeded by: Emery Gainey

Member of the Florida House of Representatives from the 20th district
- In office November 6, 2012 – November 3, 2020
- Preceded by: William L. Proctor
- Succeeded by: Yvonne Hayes Hinson

Personal details
- Born: September 30, 1958 (age 68) Gainesville, Florida
- Party: Democratic
- Education: Santa Fe College (A.S.); University of Alabama (B.A.); Mountain State University (M.A.); Northcentral University (M.B.A.)
- Profession: City manager, police officer

Clovis Watson Jr. (born September 30, 1958) is the former sheriff of Alachua County, Florida. A Democrat, he was elected in 2020 and served from 2021 to 2023. Previously, he served four terms in the Florida House of Representatives from 2012 to 2020, representing the 20th District, encompassing eastern Alachua County and northwestern Marion County from Gainesville to Ocala.

== Early life ==
Watson is the fourth child of six, and lived in Alachua County Alachua's during his childhood. Spending his elementary school years in segregated Alachua County Alachua County Schools, and was of the first class of school integration in 1970. As a teenager, he worked at a packing shed off County Road 235, packing fruit during the school year to help his father, who had two jobs, and during the summer, he was cropping tobacco and picking squash until dark for $10 a day to help pay for school clothes.

== Education ==
Santa Fe College Santa Fe College, Law Enforcement Certification; Santa Fe College Santa Fe College, AS Associate degree, Criminal Justice Technology; University of Alabama University of Alabama, BA Bachelor's degree, Interdisciplinary Studies, Human Services; Mountain State University, MA Master's degree, Interdisciplinary Studies, Public Administration; Northcentral University, MBA Master of Business Administration; Harvard University John F. Kennedy Graduate School of Government Executive Education, Leadership for the 21st Century, Graduate; Northcentral University, Business Administration and Public Administration, Doctoral Candidate.

== Pre-Legislative Career ==
He worked for the police department in the city of Alachua, working his way up to Deputy Chief of Police. Afterwards, he became the city manager of Alachua, and worked for Santa Fe College as an adjunct professor of state and local government. During his tenure as City Manager, Alachua showed tremendous growth as both industrial and technological businesses moved to the city.

== Legislative career ==
In 2012, when Florida House districts were reconfigured, Watson opted to run in the newly created 20th District. In the Democratic primary, Watson defeated Marihelen Wheeler, receiving 59% of the vote. He was only opposed by a write-in candidate, Robert W. Brinkman, in the general election, and received 99% of the vote against him. While serving in the Florida House of Representatives, Watson sat on the House Committee on State Affairs from 2013 to 2014, served as the Ranking member on the House Committee on State Affairs in 2015. In 2017 he sat on the House Committee on Government Accountability and was later on the Joint Committee on Administrative Procedures, State Affairs Committee, Subcommittee on Agriculture and Natural Resources.

Watson was re-elected to the House for three consecutive terms in 2014, 2016, and 2018 and ran unopposed in each race. He was term-limited in 2020 after serving four terms.

== Alachua Sheriff ==
On August 20, 2019, Clovis Watson announced his candidacy for sheriff of Alachua County. His opponent in the Democratic Primary was incumbent Sheriff Sadie Darnell, who held the position since 2006. Watson defeated Darnell with 59% of the vote in the August 18, 2020 primary. He was unopposed in the general election after the one write-in candidate, Robert Brinkman, withdrew. Watson announced his resignation as sheriff effective October 1, 2023. Governor Ron DeSantis appointed former Marion County sheriff Emery Gainey as his successor.

== Discrimination lawsuit ==
In February 7, 2025 Watson was sued following a claim by former deputy Kevin Davis, that during Watson's time as sheriff he was discriminated against because of his skin color. Watson vigorously denied the accusations, stating during the trial that the groomsmen in his wedding were white and claimed that the reasons for the failure to promote Davis was because of Davis' reputation as a problem deputy. The trial was extremely emotionally charged and following one hour of deliberation an all white jury elected to reward Davis $15 million.

The jury awarded $115,724 in damages to compensate for loss of wages and benefits plus $15 million for emotional pain and mental anguish.

March 26, 2025, Alachua Chronicle covers the February 19th letter.

“FDLE sent its investigative report to Durrett after Governor Ron DeSantis assigned the case to the 3rd Judicial Circuit because 8th Judicial Circuit State Attorney Brian Kramer declared a conflict of interest in the case.

The February 19 letter describes two offenses and states that “Insufficient evidence has been developed and presented to establish a criminal act on the part of Mr. Watson as it relates to either offense.

3rd Judicial Circuit State Attorney John Durrett notified the Florida Department of Law Enforcement (FDLE) that he will not prosecute former Alachua County Sheriff Clovis Watson on two criminal charges”.

On June 26, 2025, Judge Gloria Walker denied motions from Sheriff Chad Scott requesting a new trial or a reduction in the damages awarded by a jury to Deputy Kevin Davis for racial discrimination.
