= Neil A. Butler =

American politician

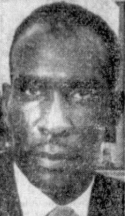

Mayor of Gainesville
- In office 1974–1975
- Preceded by: James G. Richardson
- Succeeded by: Joseph W. Little
- In office 1971 – February 1972
- Preceded by: Perry McGriff
- Succeeded by: T.E. "Ted" Williams

Member of the Gainesville City Commission
- In office 1972–1974
- In office 1969–1971

Personal details
- Born: December 3, 1928 Orange Heights, Florida
- Died: June 14, 1992 (age 64) Detroit, Michigan
- Education: B.A. and M.A. University of Florida
- Alma mater: Morris Brown College

Neil A. Butler (December 3, 1928 – June 14, 1992) was an American politician who served as mayor of Gainesville, Florida, the first African-American to hold the office since Reconstruction.

== Biography ==
Butler was raised in then-segregated Orange Heights, Florida. He served in combat during World War II and after returning to the U.S., worked as a nurse at Emory University Hospital while attending classes at Morris Brown College. He then went on to earn and B.S. and M.S. in nursing at the University of Florida where he also served as a lecturer. On March 19, 1969, he won election to the Gainesville City Commission, a significant accomplishment as Gainesville was 80% White at the time. In 1971, he was elected by the City Commission to serve as Gainesville's first African American mayor since Josiah T. Walls during Reconstruction. While mayor, he started a minority recruiting program to increase the number of Black firefighters and policemen; he paved most of the dirt roads in Black neighborhoods; formed a Bi-Racial Committee to help foster improved interracial relations; and consolidated the various city utilities into a single entity.

He resigned in February 1972, three weeks before the end of his term, after The Gainesville Sun broke a story that he had pled guilty to a $9 mail embezzlement charge in 1959 (receiving probation) when he lived in Atlanta and that he should not have run for office as his civil rights had not been restored. He was replaced by former mayor T.E. "Ted" Williams who served the remaining 45 days of his term. Soon after, the Florida Bureau of Pardons reviewed his case and restored his civil rights. Despite the prior conviction, the electorate returned him to the City Commission in March 1972 where he served during the administrations of Richard T. Jones (1972–1973) and James G. Richardson (1973–1974). Butler was grateful that his constituents were able to see that he had been a capable mayor and did not focus on a mistake he had made years in the past stating: "I had heard that some people were worried about what would happen if a black man became mayor, but I proved to them that I wouldn’t ruin the city." In 1974, he was once-again elected by the City Commission to be mayor serving until 1975 when he was succeeded by his fellow commissioner Joseph W. Little.

Butler remained active in local politics as director of the Gainesville utility system until the 1980s, when he moved to Newark, New Jersey to work at a Veterans Affairs nursing home and hospital; he eventually became the hospital's head psychiatric nurse.

On June 14, 1992, Butler died of a heart attack while attending a wedding in Detroit. He was a brother in the Beta Pi Chapter of Omega Psi Phi. He was a Methodist.

== See also ==
- List of first African-American mayors

== External sources ==
- Detwiler, Jack. "Florida Future #24 - Neil Butler - First Black Mayor of Gainesville". University of Florida George A. Smathers Library.
