= Dove World Outreach Center Quran-burning controversy =

2010 burning of Qurans by Christian preacher Terry Jones in Gainesville, Florida, USA

In July 2010, Terry Jones, the pastor of the Dove World Outreach Center in Gainesville, Florida, United States, announced plans to burn 200 copies of the Quran on the ninth anniversary of the September 11 attacks. The announcement attracted significant media attention and sparked international outrage, particularly throughout the Islamic world. Numerous world leaders urged Jones to cancel the event. His threat led to protests across the Middle East and Asia, resulting in at least 20 deaths. In early September 2010, Jones announced the event was cancelled and pledged not to burn the Quran.

Despite his earlier statement, on March 20, 2011, Jones held a "trial of the Quran" at his church in Gainesville. During the event, the Quran was declared "guilty" of crimes against humanity and was subsequently burned in the church sanctuary. The act triggered widespread protests in Afghanistan, including a violent attack in the city of Mazar-i-Sharif, where demonstrators stormed a United Nations compound, killing at least 30 people, including seven UN staff members, and injuring more than 150 others. Jones disclaimed any responsibility. Norwegian, Swedish, Nepalese and Romanian nationals were among the UN workers killed. On April 4, 2011, two U.S. soldiers were killed by an Afghan police officer, an act that was attributed to outrage over the Quran burning. American news analysts criticized and blamed Hamid Karzai, President of Afghanistan, for drawing attention to the Quran burning.

== Terry Jones ==
Terry Jones was born in October 1951 in Cape Girardeau, Missouri. He attended college for two years, worked at a hotel, and joined the now defunct Maranatha Campus Ministries. He moved to Cologne, Germany, where in 1981, he founded a charismatic church, the Christian Community of Cologne (CGK).

Jones received an honorary degree from an unaccredited theology school in 1983, and began using the title "Doctor." He was fined for this misuse of a credential title by a German administrative court. By the late 2000s, the CGK grew to have a membership of approximately 800–1000. According to the German magazine, Der Spiegel, the congregation kicked Jones out in 2008 due to the "climate of fear and control" that he employed, which included elements of "brainwashing" and telling congregants to beat their children with rods. He was accused of improper use of church funds, and forcing congregants to labor for free. A leader of the Cologne church said Jones did not "project the biblical values and Christianity, but always made himself the center of everything." Others accused him of being violent and fanatical. Deutsche Presse-Agentur reported that church members said Jones ran the Cologne church like a cult, using psychological pressure.

Between 2001 and 2008, Jones served as the part-time pastor of the Gainesville, Florida church Dove World Outreach, frequently traveling back and forth between Germany and the United States. Jones assumed full-time duties at Dove World Outreach in 2008 after leaving the German church. By September 2010, Dove World was said to have 50 members, with about 30 members reportedly attending services.

In 2010, Jones published Islam Is of the Devil, a polemic that claims Islam promotes violence, and that Muslims want to impose sharia in the United States. After Jones announced the Quran burning, the German Evangelical Alliance denounced his theological statements and his craving for attention.

Following an invitation from the English Defence League, Jones considered attending a rally in Luton in the UK in February 2011 to share his views. The anti-fascist group Hope not Hate petitioned the Home Secretary to ban Jones from entering the country. In January 2011, Home Secretary Theresa May announced that Jones would be refused entry to the UK 'for the public good'.

Jones' actions have prompted a religious group to place a $1.2 million bounty on his head; Hezbollah, a Lebanese political party and militant group, has announced a $2 million bounty.

On April 22, 2011, Jones planned to visit the Islamic Center of America in Dearborn, Michigan, to protest sharia, but was arrested, tried and jailed. Local authorities had required him either to post a $45,000 "peace bond" to cover Dearborn's cost if Jones was attacked by extremists or to go to trial. Jones contested that requirement, and the jury voted to require the posting of a $1 "peace bond", but Jones and his co-pastor Wayne Sapp continued to refuse to pay. They were held briefly in jail, while claiming violation of First Amendment rights. That night Jones was released by the court. On November 11, 2011, Wayne County Circuit Court Judge Robert Ziolkowski vacated the "breach of peace" ruling against Terry Jones and Wayne Sapp on the grounds that they were denied due process. Both men's criminal records have since been expunged.

On the evening of April 22, 2012, soon after he was interviewed at WJBK, Jones' gun fired accidentally as he got into his car.

The city allowed him to protest on April 29, a week after the trial, in a designated "free speech zone" outside Dearborn City Hall. Muslim protesters lined Michigan Avenue across the street from City Hall. About an hour into the protest, the crowds broke the barricades and a police line. They rushed the street but were quickly contained by riot police crews. The crowd was throwing water bottles and shoes at supporters of Jones. Police worked to push the crowd back across Michigan Avenue. At least one arrest was made.

== 2010 threat to burn a Quran ==
In 2010, Jones announced plans to burn the Quran on the ninth anniversary of the September 11 attacks, which he dubbed "International Burn a Quran Day". A wide range of politicians and religious groups strongly condemned the planned Quran desecration event. Jones said he canceled the event and intended to go to New York to meet with the imam of Park51, Feisal Abdul Rauf. After saying he would never burn the scriptures, on March 20, 2011, Jones oversaw the burning of a Quran.

This prompted protests, including an attack in Afghanistan that resulted in the deaths of at least 14 people. In April 2011, Jones said he is considering a trial of Muhammad for "crimes against humanity".

=== Background ===
Dove World Outreach Center, where the Quran burning was to occur, is a small congregation in Gainesville, with approximately 50 members. The church, led by pastor Terry Jones and his wife, Sylvia, first gained media attention in the late 2000s for its anti-Islamic and anti-homosexual messages. In 2009, Dove World posted a sign on its lawn which stated in large red letters "Islam Is of the Devil". Several members of the church also sent their children to their first day of school in August 2009 wearing t-shirts with "Islam Is of the Devil" printed on the back.

The proposal to burn Qurans began with a series of Twitter messages on July 12, and a related discussion on the now-removed Facebook group "Islam Is of the Devil", named after Terry Jones' book. Jones invited Christians to burn the Muslim holy book to remember all 9/11 victims. It was to be held from 6 p.m. to 9 pm. The idea initially had little support and considerable opposition, but Religion News Service ran a story describing Jones' claim that he had received Qurans to burn. CAIR refused to respond, but other religious organizations did. On July 25, Jones posted a YouTube video in which he held up a Quran and said "This is the book that is responsible for 9/11. No, to me it looks like the religion of the devil" which garnered substantial media attention. On August 3, Gainesville mayor Craig Lowe asked the world's media to ignore Jones' church as a "tiny fringe group and an embarrassment to our community", but coverage continued to increase. In early August, Sunni scholars at al-Azhar University in Cairo issued a statement warning of "dangerous consequences" if Qurans were burned. U.S. President Obama condemned the plan saying it would endanger the lives of U.S. troops abroad. American Muslims responded by saying they would celebrate September 11, 2010, as 'love Jesus day' emphasizing the fact that Jesus is believed to be a messenger of God in Islam. Other groups asked people to celebrate Read the Quran Day as a means to international understanding.

=== Reactions ===
==== Local (Florida) ====
A Gainesville Interfaith Forum which was established in November 2009 in response to earlier anti-Islam activities of the church requested for the declaration of September 11 as "Interfaith Solidarity Day", a request that was honored by mayor Craig Lowe. The Forum scheduled a "Gathering for Peace, Understanding and Hope" at Trinity United Methodist Church on the day before the planned burning. Mayor Lowe referred to Dove World as a "tiny fringe group and an embarrassment to our community". Twenty local religious leaders gathered Thursday, September 2, 2010, to call for citizens to rally around Muslims "in a time when so much venom is directed toward them."

==== National ====
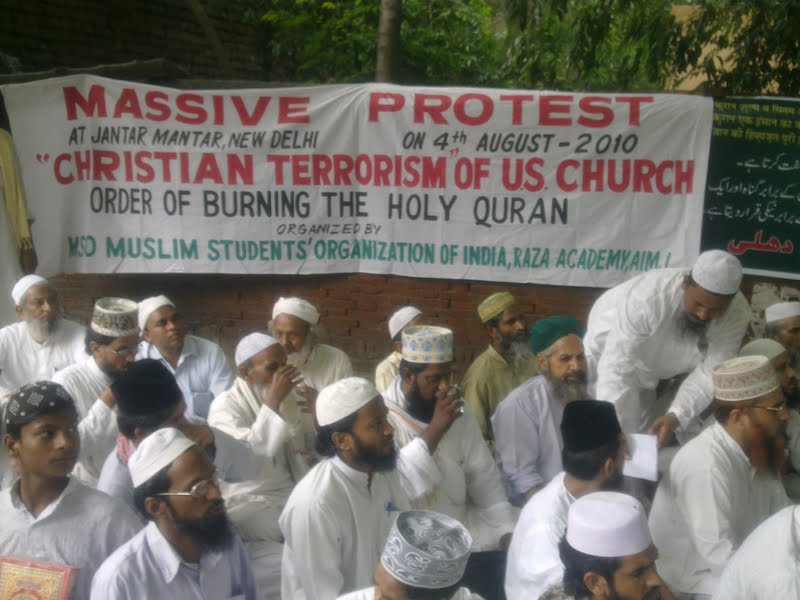
Protest against International Burn a Quran Day held in Delhi, India.

Shortly after the event was announced, the National Association of Evangelicals recommended that the event be canceled. The Southern Baptist convention also spoke out against it. The World Evangelical Alliance "asks Muslim neighbors to recognize that the plans announced by a Florida group to burn copies of the Quran on September 11 do not represent the vast majority of Christians." "It dishonors the memory of those who died in the 9/11 attacks and further perpetuates unacceptable violence." The event is broadly condemned by American religious leaders.

John Rankin, President of the Theological Education Institute in Connecticut, has started a "Yes to the Bible, No to the Burning of the Quran" effort. Also Jennifer Bryson is advocating Christian intra-faith dialogue and Christian rejection of "Burn a Quran Day".

Feisal Abdul Rauf, the cleric behind the move to build a Muslim community centre near "Ground Zero" (Park51) said that, should the burning of Qurans have gone ahead, it would have created a disaster in the Muslim world, strengthened the radicals, and enhanced the possibility of terrorist acts against America and American interests.

He also added that retracting the decision to build the mosque would send a wrong message that "moving it is that the headline in the Muslim world will be 'Islam is under attack in America'."

A group of American veterans of the Iraq War and the War in Afghanistan wrote an open letter to HuffPost calling on the American public to respect "the values we risked our lives to protect". "When citizens here participate in hateful rhetoric and intolerance toward Muslims, it leaves soldiers over there exposed." The letter concludes by asking "America, you gotta have our back."

U.S. Secretary of State Hillary Clinton said, "It's regrettable that a pastor in Gainesville, Florida with a church of no more than fifty people can make this outrageous and distressful, disgraceful plan and get, you know, the world's attention." She also said, "It doesn't in any way represent America or Americans or American government or American religious or political leadership," and she emphasized the hope of the U.S. Government that the church would not go through with their plans. U.S. Secretary of Defense Robert Gates called Pastor Jones asking him not to go through with his Quran burning. The U.S. embassy in Kabul issued a statement condemning the plans. Robert Gibbs, White House Press Secretary, criticized the plans stating "any type of activity like that that puts our troops in harm's way would be a concern to this administration."

The commander of the International Security Assistance Force in Afghanistan, General David Petraeus said, "It is precisely the kind of action the Taliban uses and could cause significant problems. Not just here, but everywhere in the world we are engaged with the Islamic community." On the same day hundreds of Afghans protested in Kabul against the planned Quran burning event, chanting "death to America" and throwing rocks at a passing military convoy. Military officials also expressed fears that the protests would spread to other cities. Military officers at the Pentagon consequently said they hoped the rare incursion into politics by a military commander would convince Pastor Jones to cancel his plans. The pastor responded to Petraeus' statement that, "We understand the General's concerns. We are sure that his concerns are legitimate. [Nonetheless] [w]e must send a clear message to the radical element of Islam. We will no longer be controlled and dominated by their fears and threats."

Republicans in Congress also criticized Jones and his plans. House Minority Leader John Boehner said: "Just because you have a right to do something in America does not mean it is the right thing to do." Former Alaska governor Sarah Palin also criticized Jones, calling his plans "insensitive and an unnecessary provocation," and Republican 2008 presidential nominee John McCain and Senate Minority Leader Mitch McConnell both argued that the actions of Jones put American troops overseas at risk. President Barack Obama made a statement on ABC News regarding the event, stating that "what he is proposing to do is completely contrary to our values as Americans." He added that Terry Jones' plan to burn the Quran will put American soldiers at risk. One book distribution website, SacredBookSource.com, offered to give away 1,001 free Qurans and 1,000 free Bibles for every Quran Jones destroyed.

==== International ====
The German Evangelical Alliance formally dissociated itself from the proposed Quran burning, because of the widely circulated report that in his time in Cologne, Jones had been associated with the evangelical alliance.

The Al-Falluja web forum threatened a bloody war against America in response to the burning of the Quran.

Various other Muslims, such as Ahmadiyya have argued that the Dove World Outreach Center is not following the true teachings of Christianity of tolerance and love. They quote Jesus: "But I say unto you, Love your enemies, bless them that curse you, do good to them that hate you, and pray for them which despitefully use you, and persecute you..."(Gospel of Matthew 5:44–45). The Head of the Community, Mirza Masroor Ahmad, has stated that "Religious extremism, be it Christian extremism, Muslim extremism or any other kind, is never a true reflection of the religion".

On August 27, approximately 100 people protested in Indonesia outside the U.S. Embassy. Roni Ruslan of Hizb ut-Tahrir, which advocates Islamic law, said,

No one will be able to control this reaction.... We urge the U.S. government and Christian leaders to stop the crazy plan from this small sect. It's an insult to Islam and to 1.5 billion Muslims around the world.

On September 4, thousands of Indonesians, mostly Muslims, took part in events across the country organized by Hizbut Tahrir. Rokhmat Labib, chairman of the group, called the planned book burning a provocation and predicted that Muslims would fight back should it take place. Lahib said that Muslims must not stay silent when their faith is threatened.

The World Evangelical Alliance condemned the plans to burn the Quran.

The Church of Jesus Christ of Latter-day Saints issued a statement declaring that "A key tenet of our faith is to accord everyone the freedom to worship as they choose. It is regrettable that anyone would regard the burning of any scriptural text as a legitimate form of protest or disagreement."

Humanists International was also critical of the plans to burn the Quran.

On Friday, September 10 in the northern Afghan city of Fayzabad, thousands took part in a protest against the planned Quran-burning following Eid ul-Fitr prayers. Violent demonstrators threw stones at a German-controlled NATO base. Initial reports said troops inside opened fire, killing up to three people and injuring several others, but a local police official said that only local police, not the NATO troops, were involved in the shooting. According to the acting police chief of Badakhshan, the protesters broke down the first perimeter gate surrounding the base and beat Afghan security guards and police on duty with sticks. Before opening fire, police allegedly fired warning shots and were also fired upon from the direction of the demonstrators, said the police official. A local police chief talking to the BBC gave his estimates of the number of protesters to around 1,500 but said that the incident that led to the shooting was a separate one with 150 people participating. This official also said that private security guards were the ones who fired at the people who tried to force their way inside the base. NATO has launched an investigation into the incident. General Zahir Khan of the Kabul police described Quran-burning a thinly disguised pretext for anti-government rallies with the Taliban in attendance.

Protest rallies were held in several other Afghan provinces: Nimruz, Kunar, Nangarhar, Parwan, Baghlan, Kunduz, Balkh and Farah. The Afghan President Hamid Karzai also spoke out against the burning of Qurans saying, "By burning the Quran, they cannot harm it. The Quran is in the hearts and minds of one-and-a-half billion people. Insulting the Quran is an insult to nations." Protests continued throughout the next two days, with three protesters wounded on September 11 and four on September 12 as Afghan security forces shot into groups of protesters, some armed with sticks or throwing stones, to disperse them. Two died in hospital due to severe gunshot wounds. On September 11, protests continued in the country, when Afghan security forces fought back thousands of demonstrators. Four demonstrators were wounded by security forces; firing when they tried to storm several government buildings in Puli Alam, in Logar Province. They also hurled stones at such buildings as the department for women's affairs. In Badakhshan province, another thousand people protested three separate districts, though the police chief said it was peaceful.

The prominent Qatar based scholar, Yusuf al-Qaradawi despite condemning the desecration said,

Responding to an assault is not by carrying out another assault, as this is discouraged in Islam .... Moreover, we, as Muslims, are required to show respect to and believe in the divinely-revealed books and all preceding prophets. If a person insults Jesus (peace be upon him), I, as a Muslim, should feel annoyed by this and act in his defense. This is what happened upon the release of a film which attacked Jesus: Muslims living in the country where the film was shown reacted angrily in protest. We believe in and highly respect all prophets and messengers, including Moses and Jesus (peace be upon them all).... The noble Quran even goes further and forbids us from cursing the pagans' idols, saying: (And do not abuse those whom they call upon besides Allah, lest exceeding the limits they should abuse Allah out of ignorance.) (Al-An`am 6:108).

Small rallies were reported in Pakistan in Karachi and the central Pakistani city Multan with around 200 protesters. There were also protests in Indonesia, Gaza, and India, a non-Muslim majority country. On September 15, regarding reports that at least 20 deaths worldwide were connected to Quran desecration protests, Randall Terry responded that "Such logic is like saying that a woman who is abused by her boyfriend or husband is guilty of bringing violence on herself because she said or did something that irritated him."

Protests in Kashmir escalated over several days, as Quran demonstrations quickly turned into separatist protests against the Indian government in the Muslim-majority province. On September 13, protesters defied a military-imposed curfew, setting fire to a Christian missionary school and government buildings. At least 13 people were shot dead by police, and one policeman was killed by a thrown rock; at least 113 policemen and 45 protesters were wounded. On September 12, a church was burned and a curfew instituted in Punjab. Violence also spread into Poonch in the Jammu division, with three protesters shot by police. Protesters burned several government offices and vehicles. Police prevented the burning of a Christian school in Poonch, and another in Mendhar the next day, in clashes leaving four protesters killed, 19 wounded, but dozens of government offices, a police station, and eight vehicles were burned. As of September 16, the Hindustan Times placed the death toll at 90, blaming much of the resentment on the indefinite military curfew, the first in ten years to affect the entire Kashmir Valley.

In Somalia, the al-Qaeda–inspired group Al-Shabaab organized a protest rally against the Quran-burning attended by thousands.

The head of Iran's Islamic Culture and Relations Organization labeled the Quran burning proposal a "Zionist" insult. A group of Iranian students also protested outside the Swiss embassy in Tehran to protest the desecration of the Quran, and chanted slogans condemned the desecration on the anniversary of the 9/11 attacks. The Iranian House of Cartoon invited international artists to an online exhibition to condemn the desecration of the Qurans on the theme of Devil against Holy Books, Devil against Human Nature and Terry Jones. More than 30 cartoons had been submitted from Iran, Turkey, Brazil, Ukraine and other countries since the event was announced on September 13. While there would be no prizes, the entries would be published at a later date. Foreign Minister Manouchehr Mottaki called the proposal "heinous" at a joint press conference with his Malawian counterpart Etta Banda. He also added that "The stance of the Muslim world, including the Islamic Republic of Iran, is transparent: Condemnation of this heinous, insulting and sacrilegious act by whoever perpetuated it. We clearly see the hands of the Zionists behind all threats and provocative moves [aimed to strain relations] between the believers of various faiths. This is exactly the sort of extremist move that seeks to realize their objectives through creating religious discord."

Iran's ambassador to the United Nations, Mohammad Khazaee, said he had filed a complaint with the body to "attract the international community's attention to Iran's stance and to warn against the serious repercussions of insulting the holy book of Muslims and hurting the religious feelings of more than one-fourth of the world's population." He also condemned the actions as "abhorrent." Iran's parliament speaker Ali Larijani censured the US for its apparent silence on the "outrageous act of desecrating the holy Quran, urging the Muslim world to take swift action against it." He added that the "silence of those who beat the drums for freedom and democracy on the blasphemous decision has drawn the ire of freedom-seeking humans and stirred international hatred of the U.S." He also said the desecration of the Quran would be a "brutal" act that shows "barbarism in the modern era." While he concluded that such measures would "undoubtedly hurt spiritual and religious feelings of millions of Muslims across the world as well as followers of all divine faiths," and warned American legislators they should expect a "harsh fate" if they do not act "wisely." The parliament's Presiding Board member, Mohammad Dehqan, said that "Whenever Zionists want to cover up their atrocities in Palestine, they try to trigger anti-Islamic sentiments across the United States and the West to deflect global public attention from their brutalities against Palestinians." He also criticised the "Zionists" for trying to paint a violent picture of Islam to discourage others from converting to Islam; he went on to urge Muslims around the world to "remain united to stop the recurrence of similar profane moves." The head of the National Security and Foreign Policy Commission of parliament, Alaeddin Boroujerdi, said the "U.S. police reluctance to react to such sacrilegious action indicates Washington's green light to such a heinous crime. The U.S. government should take serious action against the perpetrators of this provocative move and declare its stance on that regard." Grand Ayatollahs Hossein Noori Hamedani and Naser Makarem Shirazi favored the killing of Quran-burners, but that the permission of a religious judge was required.

In Iraq, Grand Ayatollah Ali al-Sistani cautioned people to show restraint labeling the act "expression of hatred of Islam."

=== Counter-protests ===
A hacker with nickname "Iraq Resistance" posted a voice-altered video to YouTube published under the byname "iqziad", claiming to have released the "Here you have" computer worm to "demand respect for Islam", blaming Terry Jones, and saying "I can smash all of those infected, but I wouldn't". The worm, first discovered August 20, attacked organizations including NASA, Walt Disney, and the Florida Department of Transportation, and produced spam that rose to 10% of all email traffic on September 9.

In South Africa, on September 10, Johannesburg businessman Mohammed Vawda had announced his own intention to burn the Bible on September 11 in the Johannesburg CBD in response to DWOC's own announcement. However, an Islamic lawyers' association, Scholars of the Truth, quickly intervened by filing an injunction against Vawda in court on the basis of opposition against burning any religious texts, and Judge Sita Kolbe of the Gauteng Division granted the injunction, thus prohibiting Vawda's announced burning. Lawyer and Scholars of the Truth spokesperson Yasmin Omar, who spearheaded the injunction with her husband Zahir, stated that the judge's ruling established that "freedom of expression is not unlimited if one exercises freedom of expression that is harmful to others".

=== Governmental reactions ===
Canada. Prime Minister Stephen Harper, condemned the planned Quran-burning in unequivocal terms, and said, "My God and my Christ is a tolerant God, and that's what we want to see in this world".

Cuba. Former president Fidel Castro called the planned book burning "a huge media show". After Jones called off the event, Castro said, "It would be nice to know what the FBI agents who visited him said 'to persuade him.'"

France. Defence minister Hervé Morin said that the threatened Quran burning and a French ban on face coverings enacted shortly afterward did not put French or NATO troops at increased risk: "when you are at the maximum, you cannot go higher".

Germany. Chancellor Angela Merkel said of the planned Florida event, "It is plainly disrespectful – even abhorrent. It's simply wrong."

Indonesia. President Susilo Bambang Yudhoyono warned in a televised speech that the plans to burn the Quran threatened world peace.

Iran. Supreme Leader of Iran Ali Khamenei said "All Muslims hold the U.S. government and their politicians accountable. If the US government is sincere in its claims of not having been involved in this incident, it must mete out a befitting punishment to the main perpetrators of this serious crime". President Mahmoud Ahmadinejad called the plan a "Zionist plot that is against the teachings of all divine prophets."

Lebanon. President Michel Suleiman denounced the plans adding that burning the Quran is a clear contradiction of the teachings of the three Abrahamic religions [Christianity, Islam and Judaism] and of dialogue among the three faiths."

Pakistan's government strongly condemned the plan. Pakistani Foreign Ministry spokesman Abdul Basit told reporters "This is against the spirit of any religion, the government and the people of Pakistan, including Pakistani Christians, are outraged at this planned, shameful act by a self-proclaimed pastor."

Palestine. In Gaza, Hamas Prime Minister Ismail Haniyeh called Terry Jones a "crazy priest who reflects a crazy Western attitude toward Islam and the Muslim nation."

United States. President Barack Obama said "I just want [Jones] to understand that this stunt that he is talking about pulling could greatly endanger our young men and women in uniform who are in Iraq, who are in Afghanistan." He also said that the planned event was being used as an al-Qaeda recruitment tool, and urged that the Quran burning be cancelled because it violated U.S. principles of religious tolerance. The president also expressed frustration that under the law, nothing could be done other than citing the church under a local ordinance for public burnings.

Vatican City. The Dicastery for Interreligious Dialogue issued a statement saying that the book burning would be "an outrageous and grave gesture".

Supranational bodies

NATO. Anders Fogh Rasmussen, NATO Secretary General, said that the church's plans would violate NATO's values and might have a negative impact on the security of its soldiers.

Organisation of the Islamic Conference expressed deep concern and alarm at the burnings.

United Nations. Secretary-General Ban Ki-moon said he was "deeply disturbed", adding that such a gesture would be intolerable by any religion.

=== Media reactions ===
Some in the media attributed the event to silly season and sensationalism.

James Poniewozik, of Time gave a few reasons for media coverage of the event: "tiny groups of fringe idiots" often get coverage, presumably because the vast majority of readers find them strange and different. The event also happens to coincide with a seeming American "Islamophobia" and concern over the "Ground Zero mosque;" he also added that "This is, unfortunately, one of those cases in which, by having become news, the story is now making legitimate news." Slate's (the title of his blog post on the controversy). "[Jones] gets to hold the country, or at least the part of the country that pays attention to such news, hostage, with reporters getting the secretary of state and our general in Afghanistan on the record to condemn this nobody. Instead of dying in obscurity, he'll die a has-been. Good work." ABC News' Chris Cuomo wrote that the "media gave life to this Florida burning ... and that was reckless." Roger Simon, a columnist for Politico responded to David Petraeus' remarks saying "The issue is not the images; it is the acts."

Both the Associated Press and Fox News stated their intention to ignore it.

Other media reactions

The conservative Powerline blog stated it was against the Quran burning, but also said that "what gives rise to this dilemma, of course, is the fanaticism of radical Muslims, who have, indeed, responded violently to real or perceived slights to their religion." John Hinderaker, a lawyer and freelance writer, argued that "Perversely, the crazier radical Muslims behave, the more it benefits them (those burning the Qurans). Today it is burning Qurans, but the broader objective is to outlaw, de facto, any criticism of Islam." Another conservative writer Michelle Malkin, echoed an article by Christopher Hitchens, when she bemoaned "the eternal flame of Muslim outrage. When everything from sneakers to stuffed animals to comics to frescos to beauty queens to fast-food packaging to undies serves as dry tinder for Allah's avengers, it's a grand farce to feign concern about the recruitment effect of a few burnt Qurans in the hands of a two-bit attention-seeker in Florida."

A Facebook page support the pastor's plan got more than 16,000 fans by eve of the event, while fans opposing the event numbered in the hundreds of thousands.

=== Actions against Dove World Outreach Center ===
The Gainesville fire department refused to grant the church a burning permit; regardless, the church planned to proceed with the event despite the potential fine. Following the July 2010 announcement of the Quran burning, the bank holding a $140,000 mortgage loan on the church property, demanded immediate repayment of the balance, and the property insurance was canceled. A lighted sign and an acrylic cross on the property were damaged by rocks. On September 8, 2010, Rackspace, the provider of web hosting service to the Dove World Outreach website, disconnected the site, citing a violation of their terms of use policy. A spokesman for Rackspace told news media that the shutdown was not "a constitutional issue," it was "a contract issue."

The city of Gainesville has said it would charge the church $200,000, representing the cost of a security presence by the police department, the Alachua County Sheriff's Office, and some city public works employees. The Alachua County Sheriff's Office estimated that it spent $100,000 on providing security to Jones, and specifically assigned 160 of the 242 deputies on duty September 11 to police activities related to the planned burning.

=== Death threats ===
Jones said that he hoped the event would not lead to violence. He said that he had been receiving death threats regularly since the event was announced. Evan Kohlmann of Flashpoint Global Partners, a firm that "tracks radical militant websites," said that a suicide bomber had threatened to drive a truck into the church and others had discussed setting the building on fire, though it was not known if the discussions were serious. The Wall Street Journal quoted an individual calling himself Abu Dujanah from a jihadist website, "Now, I wish to bomb myself in this church as revenge for the sake of Allah's talk... And here I register my name here that I want to be an intended martyr."

When death threats directed against Jones were mailed to The Gainesville Sun in a letter postmarked from Johnstown, Pa., the American Muslim Association of North America issued a statement signed by 15 imams including Ahmed Al Mehdawi of the Islamic Center of Gainesville condemning the death threats. During Jones' September 11 visit to New York, Police Commissioner Ray Kelly said that police plan to keep a "close tab on him" for his own safety.

In March 2013 the al-Qaeda English-language magazine Inspire published a poster stating "Wanted dead or alive for crimes against Islam" with a prominent image of Terry Jones.

=== Other Quran desecration incidents ===
Within hours of Jones' cancellation announcement on September 9, Westboro Baptist Church member Megan Roper announced via Twitter that the church would proceed with its own Quran-burning ceremony; Her mother said she was angry that the media had not covered WBC's 2008 Quran-burning similarly to its approach in 2010. Phelps announced his intention to "burn the Quran and the doomed American flag at noon on September 11", subsequently doing so without incident.

Duncan Philp of the Wyoming Tyranny Response Team obtained a permit to protest outside the Wyoming State Capitol from 11:00 to 13:00 on September 11. He expressed the intent to set a Quran on fire at noon, or, if the public burning was not permitted, to tear up the Quran and move the pieces in a garbage can to a private business to be burned. Members of the local Unitarian Universalist Church planned a counter-protest. Later the group described the exercise as a test of free speech and said they would take no action on state property.

In Pueblo West, Colorado, a Quran was bolted to a stop sign during the weekend of September 11–12.

In Nashville, Evangelical pastor Bob Old and another preacher burned a Quran with lighter fluid in a private yard. A group of protesters came to his house, but there were no confrontations. He decided not to post the burning to YouTube.

In lower Manhattan, protesters against the "Ground Zero mosque" took some actions against the Quran. The latter, who refused to identify himself, was reported to have been "escorted away to safety a few blocks away" by police after burning a few pages. He was subsequently recognized as a New Jersey transit worker, and was fired by the agency for violating a code of conduct, despite being off-duty while at a protest in New York. This in turn has drawn criticism from New Jersey state senator Ray Lesniak and the American Civil Liberties Union, which said a person employed in a non-policy related role cannot be fired for off-the-job political expression.

Also, in Texas, on the ninth anniversary of the 9/11 terrorist attacks, a group of protesters made up of Christians, Muslims, Buddhists and atheists gathered at Sam Houston Park to challenge the plan of evangelist David Grisham, director of a Christian activist group to burn the Quran. An activist named Isom took away the Quran from Grisham and he left the park.

Alex Stewart, a research lawyer in Brisbane, Australia, purportedly rolled "joints" using pages from the Quran and the Bible and smoked them in a YouTube video. The video was quickly removed from YouTube, but many copies have since been posted and related links. According to Michael Cope, president of the Queensland Council for Civil Liberties, "I don't think on the face of it that what he's done is an offence...nor do we think it should be," referring to the Queensland Anti-Discrimination Act. Stewart was placed on leave from Queensland University of Technology, where he worked, by its vice-chancellor Peter Coaldrake pending a review under the university's code of conduct. Coaldrake said, "The university is obviously extremely, extremely unhappy and disappointed that this sort of incident should occur... It may have occurred in the individual's private time or on a weekend – it doesn't matter... There is always, in the community, collateral damage to these sorts of things." Stewart was returned to his job on September 22 after he had "apologised unreservedly" for the nature of the incident.

With mainstream media sources pledging to limit coverage of Quran burning, individuals took to YouTube. A YouTube spokesperson indicated that they do not prescreen videos, and generally responded to complaints about the issue by placing warnings about offensive material. HuffPost questioned why the Quran-burning story was treated as major news, while many news outlets did not cover the prosecution of 12 soldiers for crimes including the premeditated murder of Afghan civilians, possibly for sport, and the keeping of body parts as trophies. Keith Richburg, a journalist for The Washington Post in Beijing, said that professional journalists "act as a filter on what information should be released or left out so that it does not hurt society", and warned that digital media allows the role of media as a gatekeeper to be undermined. American counterintelligence experts said that with no images of Quran burnings televised during the September 11 anniversary, that violent anti-American protests in Muslim countries would soon fizzle.

A Quran was found shot and burned in the driveway of the Annoor Mosque in Knoxville, Tennessee. Knoxville police and the FBI began investigating the incident as a possible civil rights violation, a threat, and a hate crime. A YouTube video posted by a user "MuslimKnoxvilleOrg" showing the burning of a Quran stuffed with bacon and doused with lighter fluid was also being investigated, though it was not immediately connected to the mosque. According to Knoxville FBI Special Agent Richard L. Lambert, "The fact that the burnt and shot Quran was placed on mosque property can be construed as a threat of force ... The issue comes down to determining what was the perpetrator's intent." Federal charges were considered, based on a 1968 law making it an offense "to use force to prevent anyone from carrying out their religious beliefs"; state charges were also considered under Tennessee civil rights law prohibiting intimidation, and misdemeanor offenses such as disorderly conduct were also explored.

In Michigan, a burned Quran was found in front of the Islamic Center of East Lansing. Local police and the FBI were called in to investigate. Dawud Walid, director of Michigan's Islamic council chapter said, "This is no different than someone painting a swastika on a synagogue or burning a cross on a black church." On September 21, the County Prosecutor said the man who turned himself in for the incident would not face charges because the act was not a crime under Michigan's criminal code.

On the north side of Chicago, Illinois, a burned Quran and a letter were found on the sidewalk outside the Muslim Community Center over the September 11–12 weekend, and were turned over to be investigated by Chicago police bomb and arson unit.

=== Cancellation (postponement) and aftermath ===
On September 9, Jones announced the cancellation of the event, and a plan to fly to New York to meet with the Imam of Park51, Feisal Abdul Rauf. In an interview on the morning of September 11, the day of the intended protest, he said, "We will definitely not burn the Quran...Not today, not ever." Despite the cancellation, visiting protesters from both sides attempted to reach the rally, but a heavy police presence dominated the area. A visitor from Atlanta who attempted to burn a Quran had his book and lighter seized by police.

The World Evangelical Alliance later contacted Jones, asking him to apologize for the planned Quran burning. In a public statement, he refused, saying, "We will not repent for standing up for the gospel", adding that Christian churches "have lost their guts to stand up for Christianity. But instead, they bow down to the political powers and the false doctrines of the nations."

As of October 22, 2010, Jones collected a new car which was offered as a reward to Jones in a "quirky radio" ad by a New Jersey Hyundai dealership owned by former New York Giants player, Brad Benson if Jones did not burn Qurans. Jones said he did not learn of the reward until several weeks after canceling the burning.

On January 19, 2011, it was announced that Jones had been banned from entering the United Kingdom by the British Home Secretary Theresa May. Jones had been invited to give a speech for the right-wing group England is Ours in Milton Keynes.

== 2011 burning of the Quran ==
On March 20, 2011, Dove World Outreach Center held a trial which they called "International Judge the Quran Day". Jones played the part of a "judge", wearing traditional robes. The Quran was placed on trial for six hours, charging it with responsibility for violence. At the end of the "trial" the jury found the Quran guilty of all charges and "sentenced" to burning. Pastor Wayne Sapp then "executed" the Quran by burning it.

Jones sought a permit in April 2011 to hold a rally at the Islamic Center of America in Dearborn, Michigan. A jury sided with prosecutors, ruling that Jones and Sapp would breach the peace. Judge Mark Somers set the bond for each man at $1, which they refused to pay. Somers remanded them to jail. Jones was barred from the area of the mosque for three years.

On November 11, 2011, Wayne County Circuit Court Judge Robert Ziolkowski vacated the "breach of peace" ruling against Terry Jones and Wayne Sapp on the grounds that they were denied due process. Both men's criminal records have since been expunged.

=== Reactions ===
After a sermon on April 1 in the city's main mosque, angry demonstrators in Mazar-i-Sharif, Afghanistan, killed at least 12 people, including five Nepalese security guards and three other members of staff working for the United Nations Assistance Mission in Afghanistan (UNAMA). Jones denied responsibility. Pajhwok Afghan News reported that the dead included Norwegian, Romanian and Swedish nationals, two of them decapitated. BBC quoted police general, Abdul Rafu Taj, as saying that "according to the initial reports... none were beheaded", and that they were shot in the head. Up to 2,000 protesters took to the streets on April 2 in Kandahar, chanting anti-U.S. slogans. The protesters burned several vehicles and hurled stones at police who were trying to control the mob. They also torched a girls' high school and burned down a school bus in the centre of the city. Security forces killed nine protesters and injured 73. Smaller protests occurred in other cities.

The Gambian government has called for the arrest of Terry Jones. Ebrima O. Camara, the secretary general and head of the civil service, described the burning as "heinous" and asked for prosecution to proceed "as soon as possible".

An affiliate website of Iran's Revolution Guard Cyber Defense Command quoted a report by the newspaper Vatan-e Emrooz that claimed Iranian border patrols were burning copies of "smuggled" Bibles in Iran. On March 25, 2011, the Iranian Ambassador to the United Nations, Mohammad Khazaee, condemned the burning and called for Jones' prosecution.

In southern Lebanon, students protested peacefully with Shia sheikh Hassan al-Zayyat outside the Lebanese International University to construct the largest Quran on Earth, weighing 100 kg. Lebanese Shia militant group Hezbollah has put a $2.4 million bounty on the head of pastor Terry Jones, according to the FBI.

On March 22, 2011, Pakistanis protested in the Punjab Christian neighborhoods and burned tires in front of a church. On March 22, 2011, Amir Hamza, the leader of Pakistan's banned Islamic organization Lashkar-e-Taiba, issued a $2.2 million fatwa for anyone who kills pastor Terry Jones. On March 25, 2011, protests erupted in Pakistan, where the Jamiat-e-Ulema-e-Islam organized province-wide protests, including a road blockage and burnings of effigies and American flags in the province of Sindh. A man desecrated the Bible at the gates of Saint Anthony's Catholic Church in Lahore to "avenge" Jones' desecration of the Quran in Florida; he was arrested by Pakistani police. The President of the Pakistani Bishops' Conference, Lawrence Saldanha, who currently serves as the Metropolitan bishop of the Roman Catholic Archdiocese of Lahore, called for the arrest of Jones. Saldanha said Jones' burning of the Quran has caused scandal and fury in the Muslim world and the deaths of more than 20 people. Archbishop Saldanha said the U.S. government should detain Jones.

A South African Islamic organization called Scholars for Truth turned to the country's courts to prevent a fellow-Muslim from burning Bibles in retaliation to threats by Jones to burn the Quran.

United States president Barack Obama strongly condemned both the Quran burning, calling it an act of "extreme intolerance and bigotry", and the "outrageous" attacks by protesters, referring to them as "an affront to human decency and dignity". "No religion tolerates the slaughter and beheading of innocent people, and there is no justification for such a dishonorable and deplorable act." U.S. legislators, including Senate Majority Leader Harry Reid, also condemned both the burning and the subsequent violence. Gen. David Petraeus said, "This was a surprise," and "That action was hateful; it was intolerant."

On April 4, 2011, two U.S. soldiers were shot and killed by an Afghan policeman in an attack that was attributed to his anger over the burning of the Quran. The attacker was later killed in a shootout with NATO troops. The attacker has been called a hero and a martyr by some of the local community, with his grave becoming an unofficial shrine, and local mosques being named after him. However, at least one local cleric has stated that the attack could not be justified on religious grounds.

== See also ==
- 2005 Quran desecration controversy
- 2008 Eucharist incident
- 2012 Afghanistan Quran burning protests
- Criticism of Islam
