= Steve Oelrich =

American politician (1945–2024)

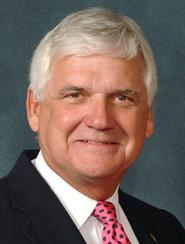
- Official portrait, 2012

Member of the Florida Senate from the 14th district
- In office 2006–2012
- Preceded by: Rod Smith
- Succeeded by: Darren Soto

Sheriff of Alachua County, Florida
- In office 1992–2006
- Preceded by: Lu Hindery
- Succeeded by: Sadie Darnell

Personal details
- Born: September 29, 1945 Pensacola, Florida, U.S.
- Died: September 16, 2024 (aged 78)
- Party: Republican
- Spouse: Cynthia Jones Steinemann
- Profession: Law enforcement

Steve Oelrich (September 29, 1945 – September 16, 2024) was an American law enforcement officer and Republican politician who was a member of the Florida Senate from 2006 to 2012. He represented the 14th District, which included Alachua, Bradford, Columbia, Gilchrist, Levy, Marion, Putnam, and Union counties.

== Early life, education, and early law enforcement career ==
Oelrich graduated from St. Petersburg College in 1968 with an A.A. in Police Administration and a B.S. in Criminology with a certificate in law enforcement from Florida State University. He also attended Pinellas County Police Academy, Florida Department of Law Enforcement (FDLE) Special Agent's School, FDLE Homicide Investigation School, National Sheriffs' Institute, The 29th Session of the FBI National Academy Executive Development Program and the FDLE Chief Executive Institute.

== Alachua County Sheriff ==
Steve Oelrich's was sheriff at the Alachua County Sheriff's Office for 14 years. He was elected as the first Republican Sheriff in Alachua County since Reconstruction.

== Florida Senate ==
=== Elections ===
In 2006, when incumbent Democratic State Senator Rod Smith opted to run for Governor rather than seek another term in the Senate, an open seat was created. Then-Sheriff Oelrich opted to run for the seat, and defeated Travis Horn in the Republican primary. In the general election, Oelrich faced off against State Representative Edward L. Jennings, whom he defeated by almost 10,000 votes, picking up a seat for the Republicans.

Oelrich sought re-election to a second term in 2010, and was challenged by former State Representative Perry McGriff, who had previously run for the seat in 2006, but had lost to Jennings in the Democratic primary. Oelrich slightly improved on his performance from four years earlier, and defeated McGriff.

=== Committee assignments ===
As a freshman Senator, Oelrich was appointed Chairman of the Senate Higher Education Committee. He served also as Vice Chairman of the Military Affairs and Domestic Security Committee and as a member of the Policy and Steering Committee on Governmental Operations, as well as the Commerce Committee, the Communications, Energy, and Public Utilities Committee and the General Government Appropriations Committee. He was also a member of the Joint Legislative Committee on Everglades Oversight and the Senate Select Committee on Florida's Inland Waters.

Oelrich continued to serve as Chair of the Higher Education Committee, was Vice Chair of the Environmental Preservation and Conservation Committee, and served additionally on the committees of Banking and Insurance, Ethics and Elections, Higher Education Appropriations, and Health and Human Services Appropriations.

== Congressional campaign ==
In 2012, Florida Senate districts were reconfigured, and rather than run for a third term in the newly created 7th District, Oelrich instead announced in January 2012 that he would run against incumbent Republican United States Congressman Cliff Stearns in the redrawn 3rd district. Oelrich was not alone in challenging Stearns; veterinarian Ted Yoho and Clay County Clerk of Court Jimmy Jett also ran. In an upset, Yoho managed to unseat Stearns, though Oelrich and Jett placed a distant third and fourth, respectively.

== Personal life and death ==
Oelrich was latterly married to Cynthia Jones Steinemann. From 1994 until 2012, he was married to Rose Mary Treadway from 1994 before divorcing. He had three sons, including Nick, who predeceased him. His oldest son, Ivan, is a local businessman in Gainesville; his youngest, Kenneth, was a student at Jacksonville University after serving in active duty in Iraq as a Sergeant in the U.S. Marine Corps.

The Nick Oelrich "Gift of Life" foundation is an annual event named after Oelrich's son, Nick, an organ and tissue donor.

Steve Oelrich died on September 16, 2024, at the age of 78.
