= 1959 College Baseball All-America Team =

This is a list of college baseball players named first team All-Americans for the 1959 NCAA University Division baseball season. From 1947 to 1963, the American Baseball Coaches Association was the only generally recognized All-America selector, so any player selected by the ABCA is considered a "consensus" All-American.

== Key ==
A	American Baseball Coaches Association
	Member of the National College Baseball Hall of Fame
	Consensus All-American – selected the ABCA

== All-Americans ==
Position	Name	School	#	A
Pitcher	Al Neiger	Delaware	1	✓
Pitcher	Bill Thom	USC	1	✓
Catcher	Archie Skeen	Utah	1	✓
First baseman	Perry McGriff	Florida	1	✓
Second baseman	Ralph Hochgrebe	Missouri	1	✓
Shortstop	Bob Klaus	Illinois	1	✓
Third baseman	John Werhas	USC	1	✓
Outfielder	Matt Encinas	Arizona	1	✓
Outfielder	Doug Hoffman	Clemson	1	✓
Outfielder	Moe Morhardt	UConn	1	✓

== See also ==
- List of college baseball awards
