= Perry McGriff =

American politician (1937–2017)

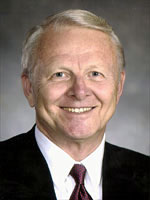

Member of the Florida House of Representatives from the 22nd district
- In office 2000–2002
- Preceded by: Bob Casey
- Succeeded by: Larry Cretul

Mayor of Gainesville
- In office 1970–1971
- Preceded by: Walter E. Murphree
- Succeeded by: Neil A. Butler

Personal details
- Born: Perry Colson McGriff, Jr. June 29, 1937 Arcadia, Florida, U.S.
- Died: February 2, 2017 (aged 79) Gainesville, Florida, U.S.
- Party: Democratic
- Spouse: Noel McGriff
- Education: University of Florida (BS)
- Profession: Insurance agent
- Baseball career
- First baseman
- Bats: Right Throws: Left
Medals
Men's baseball
Representing United States
Pan American Games
Bronze medal – third place	1959 Chicago	Team

Perry Colson McGriff, Jr. (June 29, 1937 – February 2, 2017) was an American politician, retired insurance agent, and former All-American college football and baseball player. McGriff was a member of the Florida House of Representatives, Mayor of Gainesville and Democratic nominee for a seat in the Florida Senate.

== Early life and education ==
McGriff was born in Arcadia, Florida, in 1937. He attended the University of Florida in Gainesville, where he was a member of Phi Delta Theta fraternity (Florida Alpha Chapter) and Florida Blue Key leadership honorary. McGriff played college football for coach Bob Woodruff's Florida Gators football team in 1958 and 1959, and led the Gators with fourteen receptions for 360 receiving yards and was an honorable mention All-American in 1959. McGriff was also an outfielder for coach Dave Fuller's Florida Gators baseball team from 1958 to 1960, and was honored as a first-team All-Southeastern Conference (SEC) selection in 1959 and 1960, a first-team All-American in 1959, and a second-team All-American in 1960. He received his bachelor's degree in physical education from Florida in 1960, and was inducted into the University of Florida Athletic Hall of Fame as a "Gator Great" in 1969.

== Political career ==
McGriff, a Democrat, served as the 22nd district Representative in the Florida House of Representatives from 2000 to 2002. He also served as an Alachua County, Florida, commissioner, as a Gainesville, Florida city commissioner and as Gainesville mayor. In 2010, he was the unsuccessful Democratic Party nominee for Florida's 14th senate district, losing to the incumbent Republican Steve Oelrich, 46 to 54 percent.

McGriff lived in Gainesville with his family. He died on February 2, 2017, at the age of 79.

== See also ==
- 1959 College Baseball All-America Team
- Florida Gators football, 1950–59
- List of Phi Delta Theta members
- List of University of Florida alumni
- List of University of Florida Athletic Hall of Fame members
