= Tom Miller (performance artist) =

American artist and writer

Tom Miller

Tom Miller (born October 5, 1965, in Hialeah, Florida, United States), is an American writer, film director, artist, painter, musician, actor, poet, and performance artist.

== Early life ==
Miller was adopted by Nathan Anderson Miller and Alfreda Rowena Reed Miller and lived with his aunt, Alice Miriam Reed, who worked as a piano teacher.

Miller showed interest in playing the piano starting at age three and at the age of 15 he enrolled in an acting school run by Ruth Foreman, Florida's "First Lady of Theater". He worked there as an actor and sound and light technician for five years and appeared in several TV commercials and locally produced television programs.

Miller was inspired to learn to play the bass guitar and record his own songs after listening to bassist Paul McCartney. He recorded a 45 rpm record called “The Underground” at a recording studio when he was 15 years old. During his high school studies, Miller met Charles McWhorter and they began writing and recording songs together. They were joined later by guitarist John Williford and formed the Miami band, Penguin. Over a ten-year period, the band in its various iterations recorded and released five albums. After Penguin, Miller co-founded the band Middle Earth with school friend Don Traub. Middle Earth rehearsed for two years, played only two shows and then disbanded.

== Career ==
Miller began his career in Gainesville, Florida, in 1984. He performed in the bands Plastic Age, Middle Earth, Penguin, NDolphin, Bill Perry Orchestra, The Space Masons, and Chicago's Vini and the Demons as the bass player. He is the author of 45 chapbooks, and has over 50 CDs to his credit. His poetry has been published in many small press periodicals including Ploplop, Abbey, Poetry Motel, Moon and Jim Chandler's Thunder Sandwich. In September 2014, Miller wrote an interactive hyperlinked narrative entitled Project r, which explores the concept of reality using a mixture of Miller's stories, poems, articles and blogs and also has some autobiographical content. Miller is also the writer of the play, UMMU, another piece exploring the nature of reality. Tom Miller's UMMU was presented at the Acrosstown Theatre in Gainesville, Florida as a staged reading in July 2015. It was later made into a fully produced and cast play and had its debut at the Acrosstown Theatre in Gainesville, Florida on May 12, 2017.

Miller is the writer and director of more than 100 independent video films. Miller has also directed the play, Sunset Village off-Broadway at the 14th Street Y Theatre. He is also known for performance art stunts including a naked press conference, a 17-hour reading of Truman Capote's In Cold Blood and frequent UFO secrecy protests. In 2010, he conducted a 30-hour marathon to raise awareness of transcendental meditation by watching the entire Twin Peaks television series, the two-hour pilot, and the film Twin Peaks, Fire Walk With Me - all while consuming only products popularized by the series: coffee, doughnuts, and cherry pie. In November 2013, Miller composed and released a music album called Tom Miller Plays the iPhone. "He is the first solo artist to create an entire ambient iPhone album in under five hours." In October 2015, Miller performed a piece entitled, "Operation Copenhagen" in which members of the public funded a trip to Copenhagen for his fiftieth birthday to eat in what was considered the World's Greatest Restaurant, Noma. Miller said the performance was to demonstrate in no uncertain terms the power of helping each other to achieve dreams. Miller also said he takes inspiration from Chef Rene Redzepi's way of doing things. In 2016, Miller stared for two hours at a photograph of Presidential Candidate Ted Cruz's Mouth, as reported in the Huffington Post's News of the Weird. Miller also constructed a "Sculpture of Nothing" in the Gainesville Downtown Square, inspired by the artist, John Cage. Miller has painted portraits of many Gainesville celebrities and public figures, including mayor Pegeen Hanrahan, former Gainesville Mayor Craig Lowe, former Gainesville chief of police Wayland Clifton, hemp activist and former candidate for Florida governor Michael Geison, and Gainesville's house drag queen at The University Club, The Lady Pearl.

Miller was a candidate for the Gainesville City Commission in 1995. He was the host of Gainesville's HempFests, and was a plaintiff among several organizers in a 1995 First Amendment lawsuit which the city lost, both on its initial filing and on appeal. Miller's avant-garde variety show, The Tom Miller Show, has been a staple of entertainment in Gainesville from 1984 to the present. In its current form, Miller's show is known as the Reverend Angeldust's Tabernacle of Hedonism with your Host, Tom Miller. Miller says the show is the "...longest running variety show in the United States."

Miller has received significant press coverage for his writings, artworks, performances, and activism in Gainesville over the last two decades. He continues touring with live performance art shows, poetry readings, videography, and currently performs on electric bass with various groups.
