= Lauren Poe =

American politician

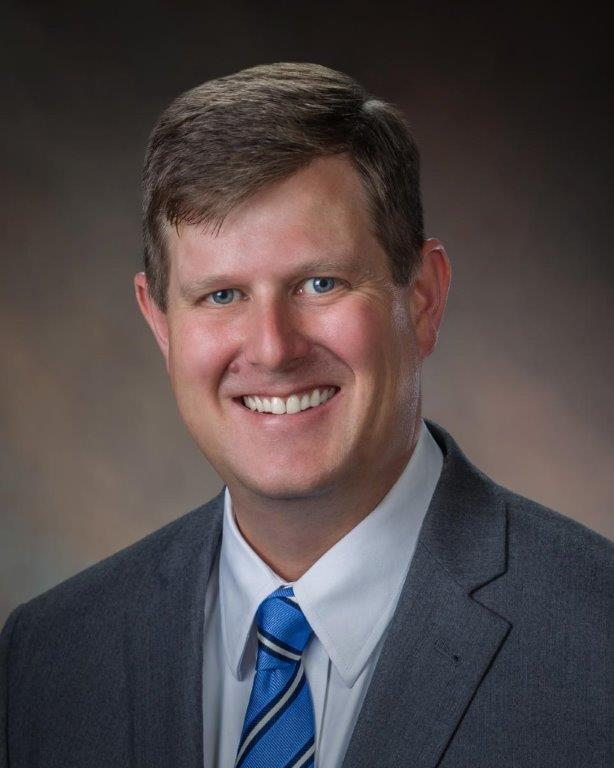

Mayor of Gainesville
- In office May 10, 2016 – January 5, 2023
- Preceded by: Ed Braddy
- Succeeded by: Harvey Ward

City Commissioner from Gainesville At-large
- In office 2013–2016
- Preceded by: Jeanna Mastrodicasa
- Succeeded by: Harvey Budd

Personal details
- Born: 1970 or 1971 (age 55–56) Minot, North Dakota, U.S.
- Party: Democratic
- Spouse: Emily
- Children: 2
- Profession: Educator

Lauren Poe (born 1970/1971) is an American politician and former mayor of Gainesville, Florida, where he has lived since 1982. He served as mayor from 2016 to 2023, as well as city commissioner from 2013 to 2016.

== Early life and career ==
Poe received his bachelor's degree in history, as well as his Master's in Social Sciences from the University of Florida. He is married to Emily Monda-Poe. Together they have 2 daughters, Elizabeth and Beatrice. He taught in Alachua County since 1998, first at Ft. Clarke Middle School and later Santa Fe College. He stepped down from his teaching position at Santa Fe College in 2021 citing health and family considerations.

== Electoral history ==
Lauren Poe first ran to represent Gainesville's second district and won in 2008 in a close runoff election. Poe is a registered member of the Democratic Party and refers to himself as a "principled progressive," but all candidates in Gainesville municipal elections are officially non-partisan.

Gainesville City Commission District 2, 2008
Party	Candidate	Votes	%	±%
Non-partisan	Lauren Poe	3,023	35.06	
Non-partisan	Bonnie Mott	3,634	42.14	
Non-partisan	Bryan Harman	1966	22.80	

And the results from the runoff:

Gainesville City Commission District 2 runoff, 2008
Party	Candidate	Votes	%	±%
Non-partisan	Lauren Poe	1,922	52.54	+17.48%
Non-partisan	Bonnie Mott	1,736	47.46	+5.32%

He ran for re-election and lost in the April 12, 2011 runoff after the March 15, 2011 election was also split between multiple candidates.

Gainesville City Commission District 2, 2011
Party	Candidate	Votes	%	±%
Non-partisan	Lauren Poe	1,774	35.07	
Non-partisan	Todd Chase	1,588	31.40	
Non-partisan	James Ingle	553	10.93	
Non-partisan	Robert Krames	1,143	22.60	

Runoff results:

Gainesville City Commission District 2 runoff, 2011
Party	Candidate	Votes	%	±%
Non-partisan	Lauren Poe	2,045	45.64	+10.57%
Non-partisan	Todd Chase	2,463	54.64	+23.24%

The following year Poe won an at-large seat, also in a runoff.

Gainesville City Commission At-Large, 2012
Party	Candidate	Votes	%	±%
Non-partisan	Lauren Poe	4,411	36.12	
Non-partisan	Nathan A. Skop	2,955	24.20	
Non-partisan	Darlene Pifalo	1,479	12.11	
Non-partisan	Donna Lutz	1,333	10.91	
Non-partisan	James Ingle	1,189	9.74	
Non-partisan	Richard Selwach	363	2.97	
Non-partisan	Dejeon L Cain	293	2.40	
Non-partisan	Mark Venzke	190	1.56	

Runoff results:

Gainesville City Commission At-Large runoff, 2012
Party	Candidate	Votes	%	±%
Non-partisan	Lauren Poe	5,718	56.64	+20.52%
Non-partisan	Nathan A. Skop	4,378	43.36	+19.16%

Poe was subsequently elected to mayor on March 15, 2016, beating his opponents, incumbent Ed Braddy and challenger Donald Shepherd with 57% of the vote (outright, without a runoff).

2016 Gainesville mayoral election
Party	Candidate	Votes	%	±%
Non-partisan	Lauren Poe	16,384	57.05	{{{change}}}
Non-partisan	Ed Braddy	11,331	39.46	{{{change}}}
Non-partisan	Donald Shepherd	1,002	3.49	{{{change}}}

2019 Gainesville mayoral election
Party	Candidate	Votes	%	±%
Nonpartisan	Lauren Poe	7,163	61.82%	+4.77
Nonpartisan	Jenn Powell	2,139	18.46%	+18.46
Nonpartisan	Jennifer Reid	1,806	15.59%	+15.59
Nonpartisan	Marlon Bruce	478	4.13%	+4.13
