= Gillian Lord =

American linguist and academic administrator

- Citizenship: American
- Education: Vanderbilt University (BS); University of Virginia (MA); Pennsylvania State University (PhD)
- Known for: Computer-assisted language learning (CALL); Spanish as a second or foreign language
- Spouse: Harvey Ward
- Scientific career
- Fields: Applied linguistics Second-language acquisition Spanish language
- Workplaces: University of Florida
- Doctoral advisor: Barbara E. Bullock; James Lantolf
- Website: people.clas.ufl.edu/glord/

Gillian Lord is an American linguist and academic administrator. She is a professor of Spanish and linguistics at the University of Florida (UF), where she serves as the associate dean for undergraduate affairs in the College of Liberal Arts and Sciences. Her research focuses on second-language acquisition, specifically the acquisition of the Spanish language sound system and the role of technology in language pedagogy.

== Education ==
Lord earned her Bachelor of Science in Spanish and English from Vanderbilt University in 1993. She completed a Master of Arts in Hispanic Literatures at the University of Virginia in 1997, followed by a PhD in Hispanic Linguistics from Pennsylvania State University in 2001. Her doctoral dissertation, co-advised by Barbara E. Bullock and James Lantolf, examined the acquisition of Spanish stress by English speakers.

== Career ==
Lord joined the faculty of the University of Florida in 2001. She served as the chair of the Department of Spanish and Portuguese Studies from 2010 to 2021. In 2022, she was appointed associate dean for undergraduate affairs and director of the Academic Advising Center at UF.

In addition to her administrative role, Lord has held several leadership positions in national professional organizations. She served as the president of the Computer Assisted Language Instruction Consortium (CALICO) and as co-president of the executive committee for the Association of Departments of Foreign Languages (ADFL).

== Research and publications ==
Lord's research primarily investigates computer-assisted language learning (CALL) and the effectiveness of technology in the classroom. She is known for her work on the acquisition of Spanish phonetics and phonology by second-language learners. One of her notable projects is Contraseña, an all-digital beginning Spanish program co-authored with Amy Rossomondo, which focuses on community-building and digital-native pedagogy.

According to Google Scholar, Lord's work has been cited over 3,200 times.

== Awards and honors ==
- Access to Education Award, CALICO (2011)
- Doctoral Dissertation Advisor/Mentoring Award, UF Graduate School (2012)
- Waldo W. Neikirk Term Professor (2013–2014)
- Elizabeth Wood Dunlevie Honors Term Professor (2016–2017)
- University Term Professorship, University of Florida (2019–2022)

== Selected publications ==
- Language Program Direction: Theory and Practice (Pearson, 2013).
- "The Rosetta Stone and language learning: An exploratory study." IALLT Journal of Language Learning Technologies, 2016.
- Contraseña: Your Password to Foundational Spanish (with Amy Rossomondo; LingroLearning, 2018).
