= Pegeen Hanrahan =

American politician

Pegeen Hanrahan, P.E.
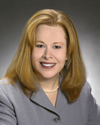

Mayor of Gainesville
- In office May 20, 2004 – May 20, 2010
- Preceded by: Tom Bussing
- Succeeded by: Craig Lowe

Member of the Gainesville City Commission from the 3rd district
- In office 1996–2002
- Preceded by: Tom McKnew
- Succeeded by: Tony Domenech

Personal details
- Born: Gainesville, Florida, U.S.
- Party: Democratic
- Spouse: Anthony M. Malone (m. 2003)
- Children: 3
- Education: University of Florida (BA, BS, MS)

Margaret "Pegeen" Hanrahan (born c. 1966) was the mayor of Gainesville, Florida, her native city, from 2004 through 2010. Described by The Nation as a "vegetarian, bike-riding environmentalist", Hanrahan has been active in politics since she was a teenager. An environmental engineer, she was elected to the Gainesville City Commission in 1996 and was re-elected to another term in 1999; she was elected mayor in 2004. In the 2007 mayoral election she was re-elected to another term.

== Early life and career ==
Hanrahan received her bachelor's and master's degrees in environmental engineering, as well as a B.A. in sociology, all with honors from the University of Florida.

== Electoral history ==
Gainesville City Commission, District 3, 1999
Party	Candidate	Votes	%	±%
Non-partisan	Pegeen Hanrahan	1,499	68.5	
Non-partisan	Frank J. Tillman	688	31.5	

Mayor of the City of Gainesville election, 2004
Party	Candidate	Votes	%	±%
Non-partisan	Pegeen Hanrahan	8,767	56.9	
Non-partisan	C.B. Daniel	6,649	43.1	

Mayor Hanrahan was re-elected on March 6, 2007, beating her opponent Wesley Watson with 73% of the vote.

Mayor of the City of Gainesville election, 2007
Party	Candidate	Votes	%	±%
Non-partisan	Pegeen Hanrahan	5,391	73.1	
Non-partisan	Wesley Watson	1,986	26.9	
