= Sadie Darnell =

American law enforcement officer

Sheriff of Alachua County
- In office November 2006 – January 2021
- Preceded by: Steve Oelrich
- Succeeded by: Clovis Watson Jr.

Personal details
- Born: Gainesville, Florida
- Party: Democratic
- Education: Santa Fe College; University of Florida (MA)
- Occupation: Law enforcement officer

Sadie Darnell is an American law enforcement officer who served as the sheriff of Alachua County, Florida from 2006 to 2021. A member of the Democratic Party, she was the first woman elected to the position in the county's history. Prior to her tenure as sheriff, Darnell spent 30 years with the Gainesville Police Department, notably serving as the public spokesperson during the investigation of the 1990 Gainesville student murders.

== Early life and education ==
Darnell was born and raised in Gainesville, Florida. She attended Gainesville High School, Santa Fe College, and later earned a Master's degree in educational leadership from the University of Florida.

== Career ==
=== Gainesville Police Department ===
Darnell began her career in law enforcement with the Gainesville Police Department (GPD), where she served for three decades and reached the rank of captain. In 1990, as a lieutenant and the department's public information officer, she became the "official voice" of the investigation into the serial murders of five college students. Her daily press briefings during the crisis brought her national media exposure. She retired from GPD in 2005 to run for public office.

=== Sheriff of Alachua County ===
In 2006, Darnell was elected sheriff of Alachua County, succedding Steve Oelrich. She was subsequently re-elected in 2008, 2012, and 2016. During her tenure, she focused on community policing, mental health awareness, and crisis intervention training for deputies. She also served as the president of the Florida Sheriffs Association from 2015 to 2016.

==== Public health initiative ====
In 2015, Darnell collaborated with Dr. Nancy Hardt and Dr. David Cheek to establish a program aiming to mitigate the long-term impacts of adverse childhood experiences. The program used geographic mapping to identify hot spots where children were frequently exposed to trauma such as domestic violence or neglect. A central component of the initiative was the creation of the Southwest Advocacy Group (SWAG) Family Resource Center located in the Linton Oaks neighborhood. By providing a centralized hub for medical care, social services, and early childhood education, the initiative sought to complement the criminal justice system by targeting root causes of crime.

==== Budgetary litigation ====
Darnell was involved in a protracted legal dispute with the Alachua County Board of County Commissioners regarding the extent of her authority over the sheriff's budget. The conflict began in 2016 when Darnell transferred approximately $840,000 between "object-level" accounts (for example, moving funds from personnel to equipment) without the commission's approval.

The case, Alachua County v. Watson, reached the Florida Supreme Court. In January 2022, the court ruled unanimously in favor of the County, establishing that sheriffs do not have the unilateral authority under Florida statues to make such transfers without county commission approval.

=== 2020 election and retirement ===
In the 2020 Democratic primary, Darnell was defeated by Clovis Watson Jr., who secured 59% of the vote. Local analysts and media outlets attributed her defeat to a broader public desire for "a fresh start with their leadership" and a shift toward criminal justice reform during a period of national civil unrest. Political observers also noted that Darnell, a long-term incumbent, faced criticism within her own party for previous bipartisan gestures, such as her 2018 endorsement of Republican Rick Scott in his bid for United States Senate. This contributed to a narrative that the electorate sought a candidate more closely aligned with modern progressive priorities, including police reform and reduced arrests for low-level offenses. Darnell retired from law enforcement at the conclusion of her term in January 2021, ending a 42-year career in the profession.
