= Harvey Ward (politician) =

American politician

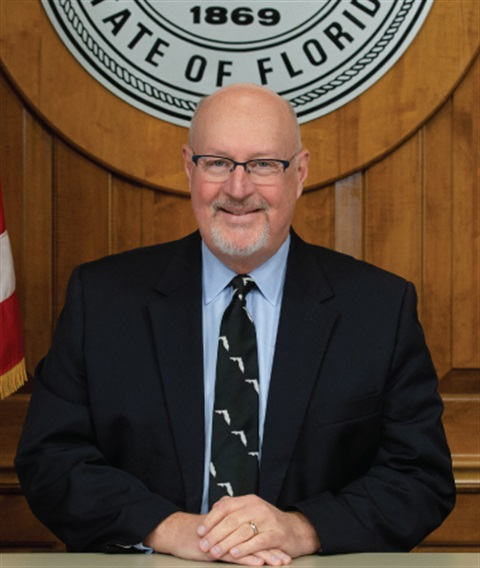

Mayor of Gainesville
- Incumbent
- Assumed office January 5, 2023
- Preceded by: Lauren Poe

City Commissioner from Gainesville District 2
- In office 2017–2023
- Preceded by: Todd Chase
- Succeeded by: Ed Book

Personal details
- Born: Gainesville, Florida, U.S.
- Party: Democratic
- Spouse: Gillian Lord
- Children: 3

Harvey L. Ward is an American politician and the mayor of Gainesville, Florida. Ward has lived in Gainesville his whole life and occupied the position of city commissioner from 2017 to 2023.

== Early life and education ==
Ward attended Eastside High School and graduated in 1985. He then enrolled at Santa Fe College in Gainesville, and eventually graduated from the University of Florida with a bachelor's degree in public relations. Ward is married to Gillian Lord, the Associate Dean of the University of Florida's College of Liberal Arts and Sciences. Together, they have three daughters. Ward previously served as the executive director of the Holy Trinity Episcopal Foundation, and in several positions at WUFT-TV/FM. Ward has served on the Gainesville City Commission since 2017.

== Electoral history ==
Harvey Ward was elected to district 2 of the Gainesville City Commission in 2017, narrowly avoiding a run-off. He was re-elected in 2020 with more than two-thirds of the vote. Term-limits prevented Ward from running for a third term. He ran to be mayor of Gainesville and was elected by more than 5,000 votes. Despite being elected in a nonpartisan election, Ward is a registered Democrat.

2022 Gainesville mayoral general election
Party	Candidate	Votes	%
Nonpartisan	Harvey Ward	20,415	57.60%
Nonpartisan	Ed Bielarski	15,026	42.40%
Total votes		35,441	100.00

Ward defeated Bielarski in the mayoral runoff, and will be the mayor of Gainesville from 2022 to 2025. He will go on to replace incumbent mayor Lauren Poe.

2022 Gainesville mayoral primary election
Party	Candidate	Votes	%
Nonpartisan	Harvey Ward	5,889	27.9
Nonpartisan	Ed Bielarski	5,570	26.4
Nonpartisan	David Arreola	3,242	15.4
Nonpartisan	Gary Gordon	3,044	14.4
Nonpartisan	July Thomas	2,119	10.1
Nonpartisan	Ansaun Fisher	449	2.1
Nonpartisan	Gabriel Hillel	273	1.3
Nonpartisan	Donald Shepherd	252	1.2
Nonpartisan	Adam Rosenthal	236	1.1
Total votes		21,074	100.00

Ward and Bielarski advance to a runoff election, defeating 7 other candidates.

2020 Gainesville City Commission District 2
Party	Candidate	Votes	%
Nonpartisan	Harvey Ward	4,983	67.89%
Nonpartisan	David Walle	2,357	32.11%
Total votes		7,340	100.00

Ward defeated Walle in the two-way primary race, winning reelection in district 2.

2017 Gainesville City Commission District 2
Party	Candidate	Votes	%
Nonpartisan	Harvey Ward	2,261	50.74%
Nonpartisan	Perry Clawson	1,183	26.55%
Nonpartisan	Sheryl Eddie	1,012	22.71%
Total votes		4,456	100.00

Ward secured a narrow majority in his first city commission election, avoiding a runoff.

2014 Alachua County Commission District 2 Democratic primary
Party	Candidate	Votes	%
Democratic	Lee Pinkoson	9,930	58.81%
Democratic	Harvey Ward	6,955	41.19%
Total votes		16,885	100.00

Ward's first election took place in 2014, where he lost to incumbent county commissioner Lee Pinkoson in the Democratic primary.
