= Craig Lowe =

American mayor (1957–2023)

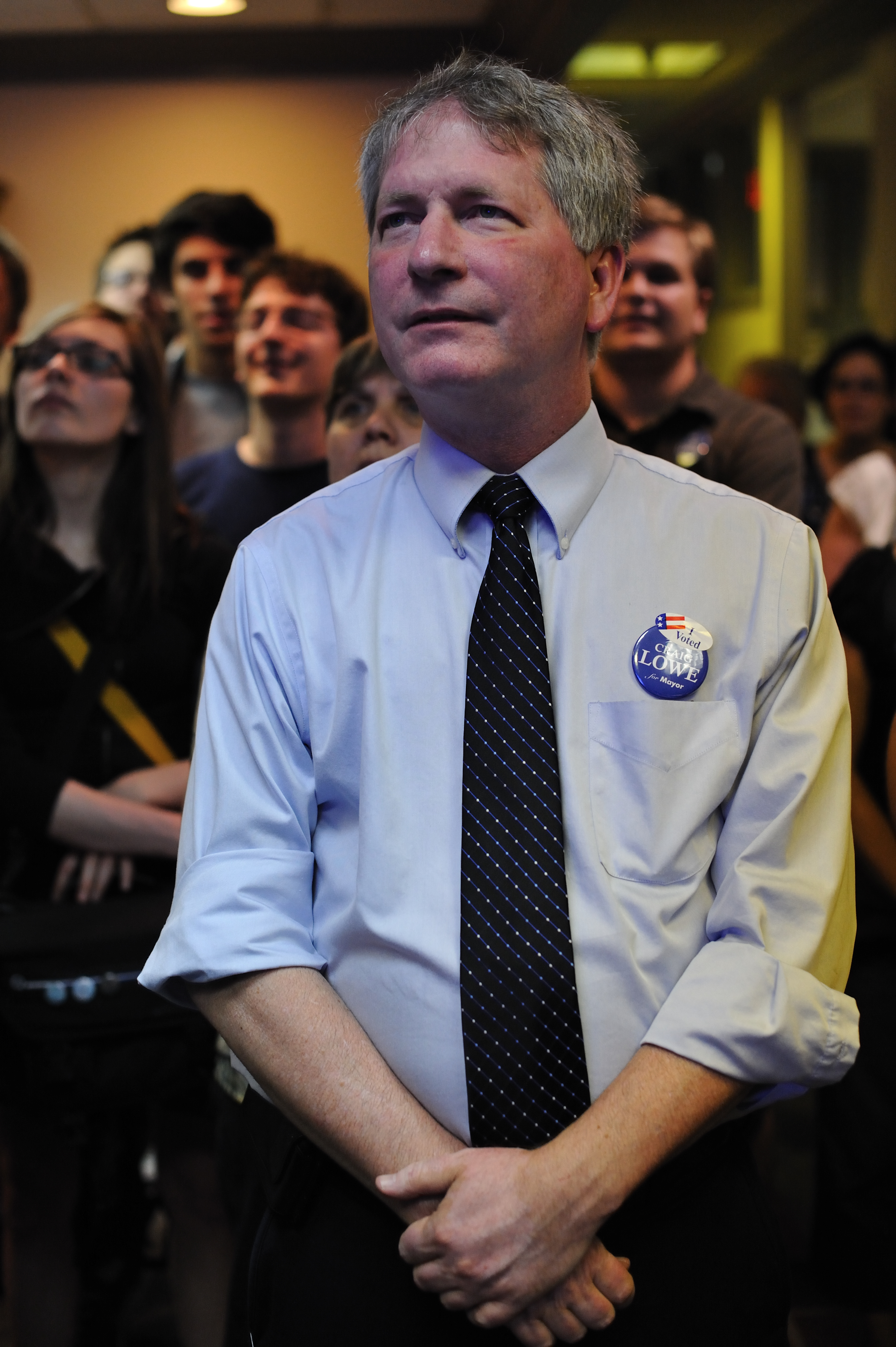
- Lowe in 2010

Mayor of Gainesville
- In office May 20, 2010 – May 23, 2013
- Preceded by: Pegeen Hanrahan
- Succeeded by: Ed Braddy

City Commissioner from Gainesville District 4
- Incumbent
- Assumed office May 22, 2003
- Preceded by: New office
- Succeeded by: Randy Wells

Personal details
- Born: July 18, 1957 Atlanta, Georgia, U.S.
- Died: January 14, 2023 (aged 65) Gainesville, Florida, U.S.
- Party: Democratic
- Education: University of Florida; University of Georgia
- Profession: Scientist, educator
- Website: City of Gainesville Bio

Stuart Craig Lowe (July 18, 1957 – January 14, 2023) was an American politician who served as Mayor of Gainesville, Florida, from 2010 to 2013; he previously served as Gainesville City Commissioner from 2003 through his becoming mayor. Lowe was the first openly gay mayor of the city.

Lowe was first elected to the Gainesville City Commission to fill the newly created District 4 seat for a one-year term in April 2003 and consecutively to two full (3-year) terms until being sworn in as mayor.

After winning a runoff election on April 13, 2010, by a margin of 42 votes (which held through an automatic recount) Lowe became mayor-elect of Gainesville. He was sworn in on May 20, 2010. He lost his bid for re-election on April 16, 2013, to former City Commissioner Ed Braddy after being arrested for a DUI during the campaign.

Lowe also served as Chair of the Gainesville City Commission’s Equal Opportunity Committee, a member of the Regional Utilities, Community Development, and Countywide Visioning & Planning committees as well as the local Community Redevelopment Agency, the Gainesville/Alachua County Metropolitan Transportation Planning Organization and the Alachua County Library Governing Board.

Lowe was a member of the Mayors Against Illegal Guns Coalition, an organization formed in 2006 and co-chaired by New York City Mayor Michael Bloomberg and Boston Mayor Thomas Menino.

== Personal life and education ==
Lowe was born and raised in Atlanta, Georgia. He received a B.S.A. degree in Soil Science from the University of Georgia. After moving to Gainesville in 1982 he received a master's degree in zoology from the University of Florida.

Lowe died in Gainesville on January 14, 2023, at the age of 65.

== Electoral history ==
=== 2003 ===
Gainesville City Commission, District 4, 2003
Candidate		Votes	%	±
✓	Craig Lowe	817	50.49%	
	Brad Guy	801	49.51%	

=== 2004 ===
Commissioner Lowe ran for re-election unopposed in 2004.

=== 2007 ===
Gainesville City Commission, District 4, 2007
Candidate		Votes	%	±
✓	Craig Lowe	1,050	79.31%	28.82%
	Richard Selwach	138	10.42%	
	Pat Fitzpatrick	136	10.27%	

=== 2010 ===
Mayor of Gainesville, 2010
Candidate		Votes	%	±
✓	Craig Lowe	4,078	40.13%	
✓	Don Marsh	2,960	29.13%	
	Monica Leadon Cooper	2,529	24.89%	
	Richard Selwach	442	4.35%	
	Ozzy Angulo	153	1.51%	

Mayor of Gainesville, Runoff, 2010
Candidate		Votes	%	±
✓	Craig Lowe	6,110	50.17%	+10.04%
	Don Marsh	6,068	49.83%	+20.70%

==== Runoff Recount ====
A runoff election was held on April 13, 2010, with Lowe and Marsh as the candidates. The unofficial results indicated that Lowe had 6,098 votes (50.14%) and Marsh 6,063 votes (49.86%), excluding provisional ballots. Ultimately 17 provisional ballots were verified, yielding 12 more votes for Lowe and 5 more for Marsh. As the margin was less than 0.50% between the candidates, an automatic machine recount took place on April 16, 2010. The recount verified the unofficial results, including verified provisional ballots, leaving the vote tallies unchanged. These are the official, certified results of the election.

=== 2013 ===
Mayor of Gainesville, 2013
Candidate		Votes	%	±
✓	Ed Braddy	4,636	38.42%	
✓	Craig Lowe	4,406	36.52%	
	Scherwin L. Henry	2,058	17.05%	
	Pete Johnson	783	6.490%	
	Mark Venzke	128	1.061%	
	Donald Shepherd, Sr.	53	0.439%	

Mayor of Gainesville, Runoff, 2013
Candidate		Votes	%	±
✓	Ed Braddy	7,258	54.72%	+16.30%
	Craig Lowe	6,007	45.28%	+8.76%

=== 2013 DUI Arrest ===
Prior to the runoff election on April 16, 2013, Lowe was arrested on suspicion of driving under the influence (DUI). The incident took place on March 21, 2013 when Lowe was involved in a single car crash. On April 1, 2013, Lowe entered into a deferred prosecution agreement aimed at first-time DUI offenders to resolve the charges against him.
