= Mayor of Gainesville =

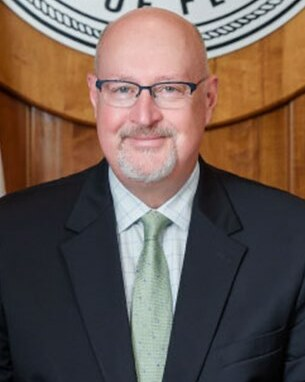
- Incumbent; Harvey Ward since January 5, 2023
- Term length: Four Years renewable once
- Salary: $44,696.22 (as of July 1, 2022)
- Website: Office of the Mayor

The Mayor of Gainesville is, for ceremonial purposes, receipt of service of legal processes and the purposes of military law, the official head of the city of Gainesville, Florida. The person holding the office is otherwise a member and chair of the city commission, and is required to preside at all meetings thereof. The mayor is also allowed to vote on all matters that come before the city commission, but has no veto powers.

== History of the Mayor's Office ==
On May 26, 1866, E. W. Perry was elected intendant (mayor) when the aldermen of Gainesville met to incorporate for the first time. On April 12, 1869, Gainesville re-incorporated, and mayors were elected for one-year terms except when they filled an unexpired term. In 1891, because the city charter was amended, two general elections were held that year. From 1927 to 1997 mayors were not elected, the position being simply that of mayor-commissioner, but as of 1998 mayors are again elected, initially to three year terms, but as of 2022, to four year terms.

== Election ==
The mayor is elected in a citywide nonpartisan election using a two-round system, i.e., if no candidate receives a majority of the vote, a runoff election ensues between the two candidates who received the most votes.

The mayor (like other commissioners) is elected to a four-year term (as of 2022, but currently in transition from a three-year term); in any case, the mayor may not serve more than two consecutive terms, excepting following a partial term created by a vacancy; however, mayoral terms are reckoned separately from terms as another commissioner, allowing a commissioner to serve more consecutive terms by alternating between the positions.

== Succession ==
Per city code of ordinances, the mayor-commissioner pro tempore performs the functions and duties of the office of mayor in the absence of the mayor. If the mayor's seat is vacated, and less than 6 months remain in the unexpired term or until the next regular election, then the commission appoints a successor to serve until a new mayor is elected. If there is more than 6 months remaining in the term or until the next general election, the seat is filled by a special election not more than 60 days after the occurrence the vacancy.

The mayor is subject to recall as provided by Florida law.

== Mayors of Gainesville ==
| Image | Years of service | Mayor | Notes / Citation |
|---|---|---|---|
| | 1869 | Samuel Y. Finley | First mayor of Gainesville, son of Jesse J. Finley; Mayors elected to one-year terms |
| | ? | | |
| | 1873 | Josiah T. Walls | First African-American mayor of Gainesville |
| | 1874 | Watson Porter | |
| | ? | | |
| | 1877 | S.J. Burnett | |
| | ? | | |
| | 1882 | John Varnum | |
| | ? | | |
| | 1885 | J.B. Brown | |
| | 1886 | S.J. Burnett (2nd term) | |
| | 1887 | W.W. Scott | |
| | 1888–1889 | J.B. Brown (2nd term) | |
| | 1890 | S.J. Burnett (3rd term) | |
| | 1891 | J.B. Brown (3rd term) | |
| | 1891 | H.E. Day | The city charter was amended in 1891 and two general elections were held that year |
| | 1892 | L.C. Lynch | |
| | ? | | |
| | 1897 | Clarence Stringfellow | Died in November 1897 |
| | ? | | |
| | 1899–1900 | J. F. Bartleson | |
| | 1901–1907 | William Reuben Thomas | |
| | 1908–1909 | Horatio Davis | |
| | 1910–1917 | Chris Matheson | |
| | 1918 | Gordon "J.B." Tyson | |
| | 1919 | Robert W. Davis | |
| | 1920–1921 | J.C. Adkins | |
| | 1922 | George S. Waldo | |
| | 1923–1924 | H.L. Phifer | |
| | 1925–1927 | J.R. Fowler | After Fowler's term, mayors were appointed by the City Commission to one-year terms |
| | 1927–1929 | Lee Graham | |
| | 1929–1930 | C.R. Layton | |
| | 1930–1931 | Hal C. Batey | |
| | 1931–1932 | Lee Graham (2nd term) | |
| | 1932–1933 | C.R. Layton (2nd term) | |
| | 1933–1934 | Hal C. Batey (2nd term) | |
| | 1934–1935 | M.H. Baxley | |
| | 1935–1936 | B.M. Tench | |
| | 1936–1937 | Hal C. Batey (3rd term) | |
| | 1937–1938 | R.B. Livingston | |
| | 1938–1939 | J.M. Dell | |
| | 1939–1940 | J.M. Butler | |
| | 1940–1941 | J.B. Carmichael | |
| | 1941–1942 | C.S. Brooking | |
| | 1942–1943 | J.B. Carmichael (2nd term) | |
| | 1943–1944 | J.M. Dell (2nd term) | |
| | 1944–1945 | Fred M. Cone | |
| | 1945–1946 | J.M. Butler (2nd term) | |
| | 1946–1947 | C.S. Brooking (2nd term) | |
| | 1947–1948 | Henry Gray | |
| | 1948–1949 | J.M. Butler (3rd term) | |
| | 1949–1950 | Roy L. Purvis | |
| | 1950–1951 | J. Milton Brownlee | |
| | 1951–1952 | Fred M. Cone (2 term) | |
| | 1952–1953 | Roy L. Purvis (2nd term) | |
| | 1953–1954 | C. B. Bohannon Jr. | |
| | 1954–1955 | Joseph C. Wise | |
| | 1955–1956 | S. Clark Butler | |
| | 1956–1957 | R.M. Chamberlin | |
| | 1957 | J.M. Steadham | |
| | 1957–1958 | Walter E. Murphree | |
| | 1958–1959 | Myrl J. Hanes | |
| | 1959–1960 | S. J. Adkins | |
| | 1960–1961 | Harry C. Edwards | |
| | 1961–1962 | Norwood W. Hope | |
| | 1962–1963 | Edwin J. Andrews | |
| | 1963–1964 | Byron M. Winn Jr. | |
| | 1964–1965 | Howard Towles McKinney | |
| | 1965–1966 | Edwin B. Turlington | |
| | 1966–1967 | James G. Richardson | |
| | 1967–1968 | Walter E. Murphree | |
| | 1968–1969 | T.E. "Ted" Williams | |
| | 1969–1970 | Walter E. Murphree | |
| | 1970–1971 | Perry McGriff | |
| | 1971–February 1972 | Neil A. Butler | First post-Reconstruction African-American mayor of Gainesville |
| | February 1972–March 1972 | T.E. "Ted" Williams | |
| | 1972–1973 | Richard T. Jones | |
| | 1973–1974 | James G. Richardson | |
| | 1974–1975 | Neil A. Butler (2nd term) | |
| | 1975–1976 | Joseph W. Little | |
| | 1976–1977 | James G. Richardson | |
| | 1977–1978 | Aaron A. Green | |
| | 1978–1979 | Roberta Lane Lisle | First female mayor of Gainesville |
| | 1979–1980 | William M. Howard | |
| | 1980–1981 | Mark Kane Goldstein | |
| | 1981–1982 | Courtland A. Collier | also served as mayor from 1990–1991 |
| | 1982–1983 | Gary R. Junior | |
| | 1983–1984 | W.E. "Mac" McEachern | |
| | 1984–1985 | Jean Chalmers | |
| | 1985–1986 | Gary Gordon | |
| | 1986–1987 | Beverly Hill | |
| | 1987–1988 | N. David Flagg | |
| | 1988–1989 | David Coffey | |
| | 1989–1990 | Cynthia Chestnut | First female African-American mayor of Gainesville |
| | 1990–1991 | Courtland A. Collier | |
| | 1991–1992 | Rodney J. Long | |
| | 1992–1993 | Thomas McKnew | |
| | 1993–1994 | James Painter | |
| | 1994–1995 | Paula M. DeLaney | |
| | 1996–1997 | Ed Jennings Sr. | |
| | 1997–1998 | Bruce L. Delaney | |
| | 1998–2001 | Paula M. DeLaney | First elected mayor of Gainesville since 1927 |
| | 2001–2004 | Thomas D. Bussing | |
| | 2004–2010 | Pegeen Hanrahan | |
| | 2010–2013 | Craig Lowe | |
| | 2013–2016 | Ed Braddy | |
| | 2016–2023 | Lauren Poe | |
| | 2023-present | Harvey Ward | |
