= Chronology of the reactions to Innocence of Muslims =

This article covers the chronology of the reactions to Innocence of Muslims. The uploading of the Innocence of Muslims films trailer resulted in protests, deaths and hundreds of injuries in several cities in the world.

== Timeline ==
=== Before September, 2012 ===
- In July, 2012, the 14-minute trailer for the film Innocence of Muslims is posted on YouTube by Sam Bacile.
- Several weeks prior to the September protests, Bacile contacts Florida pastor Terry Jones to promote and link the film on Jones' Stand Up America Now website. Jones said on September 13, "We were contacted several weeks ago by the director who wanted us to promote the film and give it a stamp of approval."

=== September 4 ===
- A version of the trailer dubbed into Arabic, is posted on the same YouTube channel as the original English version.
- According to the NY Times, the video is "then copied and viewed tens of thousands of times more" between September 4 and September 11.
- Morris Sadek, an Egyptian-born Coptic Christian, contacts Cairo reporter Gamel Girgis from the newspaper Youm Al Sabaa (Youm7), and emails him a link to the video. Says Girgis, "He told me he produced a movie last year and wanted to screen it on Sept. 11th to reveal what was behind the terrorists’ actions that day, Islam."

=== September 5 ===
- Sadek promotes the film on his Arabic-language blog, including a YouTube link to the newly posted Arabic version of the video.

=== September 6 ===
- Girgis publishes a 3-paragraph article in the Cairo newspaper Youm Al Sabaa (Youm7), based on the information from Sadek, including the backing of the video by American pastor Terry Jones. Girgis calls the video "shocking", but concludes that it "is just a passing crisis that doesn’t affect the bond between Muslims and Copts."
- Sadek sends an email to international journalists promoting a September 11 event to be held by Terry Jones, including a link to the video.

=== September 8 ===
- Egyptian television station Al-Nas airs a 2-minute Arabic-language clip from the Bacile film, as part of the broadcast by Islamist pundit Sheikh Khalad Abdalla who denounces the film.

=== September 9 ===
- Cairo newspaper Youm7 reports that an Egyptian political party leader "denounced the production of the film with the participation of vengeful Copts, accompanied by the extremist priest Terry Jones."
- A clip of the Egyptian TV show segment is posted on YouTube including both the 2-minute clip from the film, and denunciation by pundit Khaled Abdalla. It receives almost 400,000 hits over the next few days.
- Sadek tweets another link to the Arabic version of the full 14-minute video.

=== September 11 ===
- US Ambassador to Benghazi, Libya J. Christopher Stevens is killed in a bomb attack aged 52.
- Protesters in Cairo climb over the walls of the US Embassy and tear down an American flag, replacing it with a black flag inscribed with Islamic emblems. Egyptian police have surrounded the compound to block further incursions.
- Protesters in Cairo condemn this film promoted by controversial American pastor Terry Jones as a "humiliation of Muhammad under the pretext of freedom of speech".
- The Muslim Brotherhood in Egypt releases a statement from its political arm, the Freedom and Justice Party (FJP), "condemning the anti-Islam film made by certain US Coptic Christians with dubious – apparently personal – agendas."

=== September 12 ===
- U.S. president Barack Obama says that the United States rejects denigration of religious beliefs.
- Sam Bacile, supposed writer and director of the allegedly privately produced film that motivated the attacks, has gone into hiding, while a second person, apparently separately, claims production of the video.
- Afghanistan blocks access to YouTube until the video is taken down.
- Syrian rebels express outrage that the alleged privately produced video belittling Muhammad is generating more anger among Arabs than the rising death toll within Syria.

=== September 13 ===
- Protestors breach the walls of the U.S. embassy compound in Sana'a, Yemen.
- U.S. officials say they are investigating whether the protests over Innocence of Muslims denigrating Muhammad were used as a cover by the Benghazi consulate attackers, rather than being spurred by them.
- The US consulate in the suburbs of Berlin, Germany, is briefly evacuated due to suspicions over the contents of an envelope.
- Yemeni police fire warning shots in the air and four people are killed. The Egyptian ministry of health says 224 people are injured in demonstrations around the embassy in Cairo. In Kuwait, 500 people gathered and chanted near the embassy.
- More details emerge about the "privately" produced anti-Islam film that sparks unrest in the world. Sam Bacile is also the name a Washington-based activist assumed to initiate forwarding the link last week. One reporter points to the suspected real name of "Abano(u)b Basseley".
- In short, Florida Pastor Terry Jones and Copt Washington-based lawyer Morris Sadek are two of the promoters of the film.
- Another person, named Nakoula Basseley Nakoula, self-identified manager of the company that allegedly produced the film, is identified by a security official.

=== September 14 ===
- Protesters attacked the German and British embassies in the Sudanese capital of Khartoum.
- At least seven people were killed during protests in Khartoum, Tunis and Cairo.
- The United States Consulate in Chennai, India was targeted by Tamil Nadu Muslim Munnetra Kazagham resulting in minor damage to the consulate and Injuries to 25 protesters after Police resort to Riot Control methods.
- Protesters in Tripoli, Lebanon, set fire to a KFC and a Hardee's restaurant, sparking clashes with local security forces. One protester has been killed and 25 people have been wounded, including 18 police officers.
- Clashes occurred in the Yemeni capital of Sanaa.
- In the Sinai, an international observer base near El Gorah is shot at. Two observers are injured.
- At least two American Marines and 16 Taliban fighters were killed in a Taliban attack on Camp Bastion airbase in Afghanistan's Helmand Province, according to a spokesman at nearby Camp Leatherneck. The attack was a complex and coordinated assault using several types of weapons. The Taliban claimed that it was in response to the film, and have also stated that Prince Harry, who is currently stationed at the base, was the target of the attack. A hangar within the facility suffered considerable damage, with five aircraft destroyed and three others being damaged.
- Hundreds of Muslims protesting the film riot in Jerusalem and the Damascus Gate, and hurl stones at police officers.

=== September 15 ===
- At least 4 were killed and 46 injured during protests near the American embassy in Tunis, the capital of Tunisia. The U.S. government pulled out all non-essential personnel and urged its citizens to leave the city.
- Egyptian riot police stormed Tahrir Square and arrested at least 220 protesters after four days of clashes in Cairo. A 35-year-old man died of birdshot wounds after clashes near the US embassy overnight. Authorities announced the number of injured since the beginning of protests had risen to more than 250.
- In Yemen, a statement from AQAP called for Muslims everywhere to attack American embassy personnel.
- Saudi Arabia's Grand Mufti, Sheikh Abdul-Azeez ibn Abdullaah Aal ash-Shaikh, denounced the attacks and urged governments and international bodies to criminalise insults against prophets.
- Violent protests occurred in Sydney, Australia, where up to six hundred people marched. Several scuffles broke out between security forces and protesters, with rocks and bottles being thrown.
- Over 80 people were arrested during a protest near the US embassy on Champs-Élysées in Paris, France.
- Sudan refused a US government request to station a Marine platoon at its embassy in Khartoum, forcing authorities to pull out all non-essential personnel and advise American citizens to avoid travelling to the country.
- Al Qaeda indicated responsibility for the attack in Libya, citing revenge for a US drone strike in June that killed Abu Yahya al-Libi, a Libyan who served as lieutenant to Ayman al-Zawahiri, the head of al-Qaeda.

=== September 18 ===
- Egypt's general prosecutor issues eight arrest warrants on charges related to the film. Because the accused all reside outside of Egypt, and thus would be tried in absentia, the symbolic act by the prosecutor is seen as aimed at quelling some of the public anger over the film. The names include American pastor Terry Jones, and seven Egyptian Coptic Christians including Nakoula Basseley Nakoula (Sam Bacile), and Morris Sadek.

=== September 19 ===
- A DHS report released on September 11 and reported by Fox News on September 19 indicated that a web statement incited "sons of Egypt" to pressure America to release Sheikh Omar Abdel-Rahman (the so-called "blind sheikh) "even if it requires burning the embassy down with everyone in it." The Web statement was apparently posted on an Arabic-language forum on September 9, two days before the attack, and was in reference to the embassy in Egypt.
