= Reactions to Innocence of Muslims =

Response to a 2012 film release

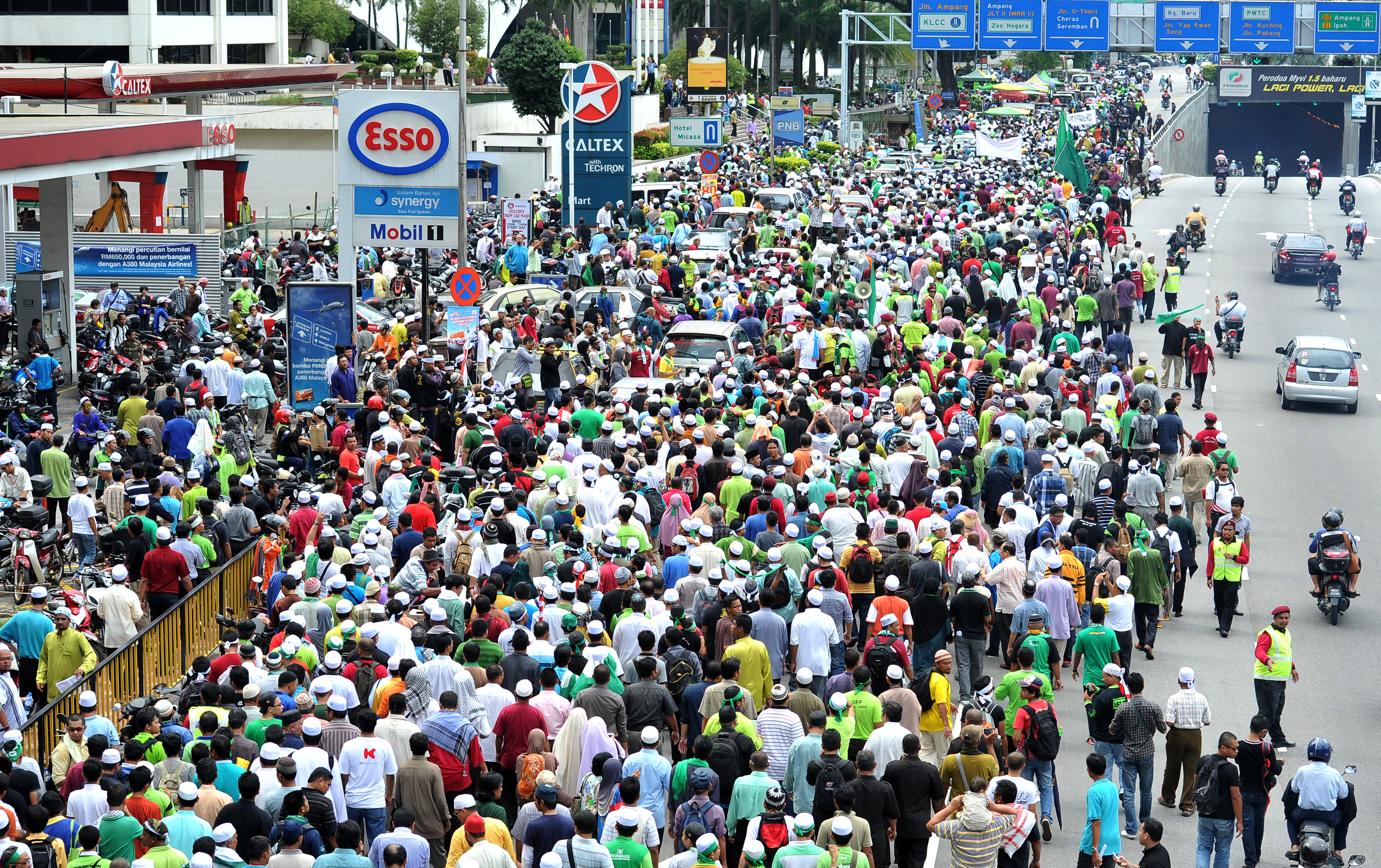
- Thousands of protesters march towards the US Embassy in Kuala Lumpur in protest at the film.
- Date: September 11–29, 2012
- Location: Worldwide
- Caused by: Innocence of Muslims
- Methods: Demonstrations; Riots; Assault

Casualties and losses
- Over 50 deaths: 12 (Afghanistan); 23 (Pakistan); 4 (Yemen); 4 (Tunisia); 4 (Israeli border); 3 (Sudan); 3 (Lebanon); 1 (Egypt); At least 694–695 injured: At least 280 (Pakistan); 250 (Egypt); 46 (Tunisia); 35 (Yemen); 25 (India); 25 (Australia); 15 (Lebanon); 4 (Paris, France); 1–2 (Indonesia); At least 1 (Afghanistan); 1 (Niger); 1 (Antwerp, Belgium)

The release of the anti-Islamic short film Innocence of Muslims triggered numerous demonstrations across North Africa, the Middle East and South Asia. On September 11, 2012, dozens of protestors scaled the walls and entered the courtyard of the U.S. embassy in Cairo, Egypt. On September 13, 2012, protests occurred at the U.S. embassy in Sanaa, Yemen, resulting in the deaths of four protesters and injuries to thirty-five protesters and guards. On September 14, the U.S. consulate in Chennai was attacked, resulting in injuries to twenty-five protesters. Protesters in Tunis, Tunisia, climbed the U.S. embassy walls and set trees on fire. At least four people were killed and forty-six injured during protests in Tunis on September 15. Further protests were held at U.S. diplomatic missions and other locations in the days following the initial attacks. Related protests and attacks resulted in numerous deaths and injuries across the Middle East, Africa, Pakistan, and Afghanistan.

The 2012 Benghazi attack occurred during the night after protesters penetrated the grounds of the U.S. embassy in Cairo. For days after the attack, CIA analysts believed the Benghazi incident had been "spontaneously inspired" by the Cairo incident, which Benghazi residents could view on an Egyptian satellite television service, though analysts later concluded the attack had been planned in advance. On the day after the attack, Ansar al-Sharia claimed partial responsibility, though it also said "it was a spontaneous popular uprising in response to what happened by the West." The early conflicting accounts generated significant political controversy during subsequent investigations through 2015.

== Background ==
=== Context of reactions ===
The late 20th and early 21st centuries have seen several major incidents of the Islamic world taking offence at pictorial or written representation of Muhammad and his teachings. In practice people have been brought to trial, killed or had a fatwa called on them for a wide range of acts that have been cited as blasphemous, including depicting Muhammad either in writing or in some other manner that was perceived as insulting.

=== Background ===
A trailer for a movie called Innocence of Muslims, described by Reuters as depicting the Islamic prophet, Muhammad "as a fool, a philanderer and a religious fake" and showed him having sex, was uploaded to YouTube in early July 2012, and an Arabic-dubbed version uploaded to YouTube on September 4, 2012. NBC News described the trailer as depicting Muhammad "as a womanizer, a homosexual, and a child abuser." The film was supported by the U.S. pastor Terry Jones, who had previously angered Muslims by announcing plans to burn the Quran publicly. Reuters cited the broadcast of an excerpt of the trailer on Egyptian TV network Al-Nas on September 8, on a show hosted by Sheikh Khalad Abdalla, as "the flashpoint for the unrest." Prior to the 2011 revolution, Egyptian authorities periodically suspended al-Nas for "promoting religious or sectarian hatred."

On September 11, hours before the attacks, in response to the promotion of the film and in anticipation of protests, the U.S. Embassy in Cairo issued the following statement:

The Embassy of the United States in Cairo condemns the continuing efforts by misguided individuals to hurt the religious feelings of Muslims – as we condemn efforts to offend believers of all religions. Today, the 11th anniversary of the September 11, 2001 terrorist attacks on the United States, Americans are honoring our patriots and those who serve our nation as the fitting response to the enemies of democracy. Respect for religious beliefs is a cornerstone of American democracy. We firmly reject the actions by those who abuse the universal right of free speech to hurt the religious beliefs of others.

The statement was no longer online as of September 13, 2012.

==== Movement for Omar Abdel-Rahman ====
On June 29, newly-elected Egyptian President Mohamed Morsi pledged to free Omar Abdel-Rahman, whom he described as a political prisoner. On August 2, Egypt formally requested that the United States release Abdel-Rahman.

On August 30, according to Eric Trager, al-Jama'a al-Islamiyya called for a protest at the US embassy in Cairo on September 11 to demand the release of Abdel-Rahman.

On September 8, El Fagr reported on a threat to burn down the US embassy in Cairo unless Abdel-Rahman was released. Raymond Ibrahim described this threat as a unified statement by the Egyptian Islamic Jihad and al-Jama'a al-Islamiyya.

A DHS report released on September 11 and reported by Fox News on September 19 indicated that a web statement incited "sons of Egypt" to pressure America to release Abdel-Rahman "even if it requires burning the embassy down with everyone in it." The Web statement was apparently posted on an Arabic-language forum on September 9, two days before the attack, and was in reference to the embassy in Egypt.

== Protests at diplomatic missions ==
Widespread protests followed screening of excerpts of the trailer in Egypt. Many of the protests were focused on United States embassies and consular posts, with some leading to violent confrontations.

=== Egypt ===
In Egypt, the protest was organized by Wesam Abdel-Wareth, a Salafist leader and president of Egypt's Hekma television channel, who called for a gathering on September 11 at 5 pm in front of the United States Embassy, to protest against a film that he thought was named Muhammad's Trial. However, Eric Trager, an expert at the Washington Institute for Near East Policy, has said that the protest was in fact announced on August 30 by Jamaa Islamiya, to release Omar Abdel Rahman. After the trailer for the film began circulating, Nader Bakkar, the Egyptian Salafist al-Nour Party's spokesman, and Muhammad al-Zawahiri, the brother of al-Qaeda leader Ayman al Zawihiri, called for Egyptians to assemble outside of the American embassy.

About 3,000 demonstrators, many of them from the ultraconservative Salafi movement, responded to his call. A dozen men were then reported to have scaled the embassy walls, after which one of them tore down the flag of the United States and replaced it with a black Islamist flag with the inscription of the shahada: "There is no god but Allah and Muhammad is the messenger of Allah". Some of the protesters also wrote "There is no God but Allah" on the compound walls. According to Sherine Tadros of Al Jazeera, the protestors demanded that the film be taken "out of circulation" and that some of the protestors would stay at the site until that happens. Thousands of Egyptian riot police were at the embassy following the breach of the walls; they eventually persuaded the trespassers to leave the compound without the use of force. After that, only a few hundred protesters remained outside the compound. Reports that the United States Marines were not allowed to carry live ammunition by the State Department were later proven to be incorrect.

Egypt's prime minister Hesham Qandil said "a number" of protesters later confessed to getting paid to participate. He did not say whether the government knew or suspected who paid the protesters.

On September 14, in the town of Sheikh Zuweid in the Sinai Peninsula, protesters stormed a compound of the Multinational Force and Observers, designed to monitor the peace treaty between Egypt and Israel. The peacekeeping force opened fire on the protesters. Two members of the peacekeeping force were wounded.

Ahmad Fouad Ashoush, a Salafist Muslim cleric, issued a fatwa saying: "I issue a fatwa and call on the Muslim youth in America and Europe to do this duty, which is to kill the director, the producer and the actors and everyone who helped and promoted the film." Another Muslim cleric, Ahmed Abdullah (a.k.a. Abu Islam) tore up the Bible and threw the torn pages on the ground during the September 11 embassy attack.

=== Yemen ===
In Yemen, the protests started on September 13, after Abdul Majeed al-Zindani, a cleric and former mentor to Osama bin Laden, called on followers to emulate the attacks in Egypt and Libya.

Hours later, protesters had stormed the grounds of the U.S. embassy in Sanaa. Police fired into the air in an attempt to hold back the crowds, but failed to prevent them from gaining access to the compound and setting fire to vehicles. Guards in Sanaa used tear gas and a water cannon to drive back the crowd. At least 5 protesters were killed and 11 others injured; 24 guards were also injured.

The U.S. responded by sending a Marine FAST unit to Yemen.

=== Greece ===
About 600 Muslim protestors in Athens tried to march on the U.S. Embassy, but were stopped by Greek police. No injuries were reported, although three cars were damaged and three storefronts were smashed. One protester claimed "we are all with Osama" and called on the US to hang the filmmaker.

=== Sudan ===
In anticipation of protests, Sudanese authorities deployed "many, many riot police" near the American embassy in Khartoum. Nevertheless, on September 14, protesters breached the outside wall of the compound and clashed with guards; three people were killed.

Also after Friday prayers on September 14, protesters started fires and tore down the flag in the German embassy. Demonstrators hoisted a black Islamic flag at the German embassy, which read in white letters "there is no God but Allah and Mohammed is his Prophet". Although it was initially assumed that the attacks were to a target of opportunity related to the protests against the film Innocence of Muslims, the incident is now reported as a long-planned deliberate attack against Germany; preachers encouraged the riots by referring to Germany's defending Danish cartoonist Kurt Westergaard in 2012 during the Jyllands-Posten Muhammad cartoons controversy. Referring to a demonstration in August 2012 by right-winged German protesters during which pictures of Mohammed were shown, the Sudanese foreign minister justified the attacks by saying that German chancellor Angela Merkel had allowed these demonstrations to proceed and had thereby encouraged "an insult to Islam and clearly violated all rules of religious coexistence and tolerance."

The neighboring British embassy was also attacked, with two people killed in clashes with the police.

=== Tunisia ===
In Tunis, on September 14, protesters entered the compound of the U.S. embassy after climbing the embassy walls and set trees inside the compound ablaze. The protesters attacked the American Cooperative School of Tunis and set it on fire. At least 4 were killed and 46 injured during protests near the embassy on September 15. The U.S. government pulled out all non-essential personnel and urged its citizens to leave the city.

=== India ===
On September 14, the US consulate in Chennai, India, was attacked, with protestors throwing stones and footwear at the consulate. Police dispersed the crowd, causing minor injuries to 25 protesters. The Consulate asked American citizens to enroll in the STEP program, asked American citizens to follow the local news and media and ceased the consulate's operation temporarily. Additional police protection for the consulate was also granted by the Tamil Nadu Government.

=== Indonesia ===
On September 17, up to 500 protesters, many of whom were part of the Islamic Defenders Front and Indonesian Mujahedeen Council attacked the U.S. embassy in Jakarta by throwing stones and loose pavement, some reports also state that petrol bombs were used in the attacks. In addition to attacking the embassy, protesters attacked the local police force and embassy guards.

=== Pakistan ===
Pakistan witnessed widespread protests all across the country. On September 14, security forces clashed with demonstrators outside the U.S. embassy in Islamabad over Innocence of Muslims. Protesters called for the execution of the filmmaker and urged Islamabad to close the U.S. Embassy and expel its diplomats. In the eastern city of Lahore, demonstrators burned the U.S. flag outside the U.S. consulate and shouted slogans against the United States and Israel. On September 16, Voice of America News reported that police fired tear gas and water cannon at hundreds of demonstrators as they approached the heavily guarded consulate in the southern city of Karachi. On September 19, a businessman who was unwilling to participate in the protests was charged for blasphemy. On September 20, CNN reported that protests continued in Karachi, where according to a police official about "100 small children" repeated anti-American slogans during a protest. Video showed children repeating an adult voice, "Death to America" and "Any friend of America is a traitor." The children, between the ages of 6 and 8, demonstrated across from the Karachi Press Club, led by "at least four teachers." In Islamabad, police used tear gas and fired warning shots into the air to disperse the crowd. Islamabad Police Chief Bin Yamin said eight police were injured. On September 21, a public holiday was held in Pakistan as protests under the banner of "Love our prophet" were held across the country. The newspaper Dawn reported that at least 23 people were killed during the day. In Karachi, a crowd of 15,000 torched "six cinemas, three Hindu temples, two banks, a post office and 5 police vehicles" whilst some fired on police, killing two police officers. It was further reported that 10 of the protesters were shot dead afterwards. Meanwhile, in Peshawar, four protesters and a policeman were killed. Ghulam Ahmad Bilour, a Pakistani cabinet minister, announced a $100,000 bounty for killing Nakoula Basseley Nakoula. The Pakistani government has sought to distance itself from this award. Some British MPs have called for a ban on Bilour's visits to Britain. On September 23, a rampaging mob of protesters in Mardan reportedly "set on fire the church, St Paul's high school, a library, a computer laboratory and houses of four clergymen, including Bishop Peter Majeed." and went on to rough up Zeeshan Chand, the pastor's son.

=== Benghazi ===
In Benghazi, Libya, heavily armed attackers killed the U.S. Ambassador J. Christopher Stevens and three other Americans on September 11. In eleven drafts of "talking points" through September 15, the CIA assessed that the attack was "spontaneously inspired by the protests at the U.S. Embassy in Cairo." Some U.S. officials, speaking under anonymity, said that they believed the Benghazi attack was coordinated and planned in advance, and not prompted by the video. On the night of the attack, the State Department Operations Center emailed the White House and Pentagon that Ansar al-Sharia had taken responsibility for the attack, although the next day the group issued a statement saying it "didn't participate as a sole entity; rather, it was a spontaneous popular uprising in response to what happened by the West," an apparent reference to the release of the video. Al-Qaeda also claimed responsibility and said it was in revenge for a U.S. drone strike which killed Libyan Abu Yahya al-Libi, an al-Qaeda leader. The role of the video in motivating the attack quickly became an ongoing dispute in the American political arena. Numerous eyewitnesses reported that the attackers said they were motivated by the video. Though Libyan officials initially stated that hundreds of protesters had been present before the attack, later investigations by the U.S. government concluded that no protest took place prior to the attack. In eleven drafts of "talking points" that reflected evolving intelligence, the CIA initially assessed that the attack was "spontaneously inspired by the protests at the U.S. Embassy in Cairo" that occurred hours earlier and had been triggered by the release of the video. During the hours before the attack, Egyptian satellite television networks popular in Benghazi had been covering the outrage over the video.

== Other protests ==
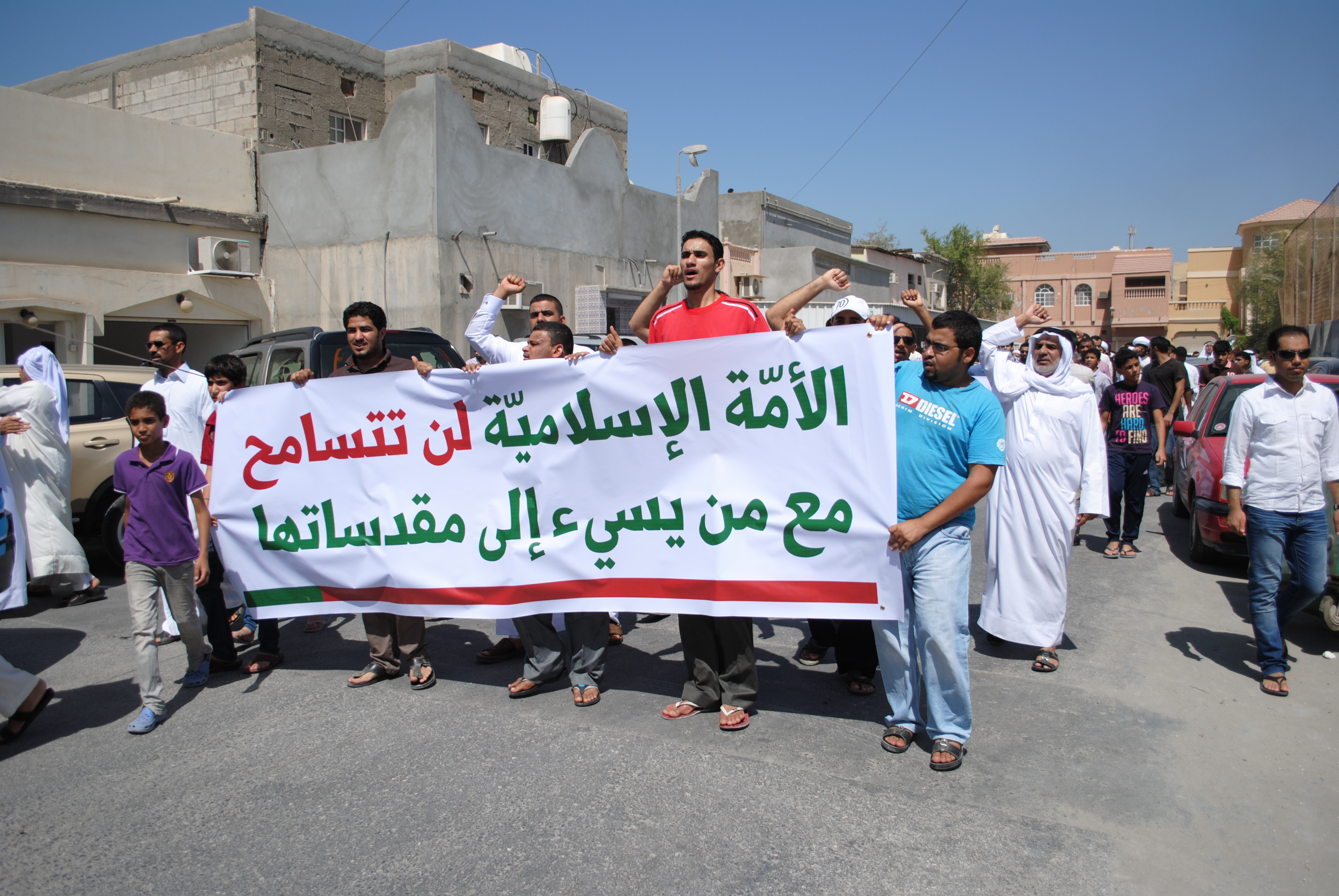
Protesters in Bahrain denouncing the film

Egyptian TV host Sheikh Khaled Abdullah, in his broadcast of September 8 on Al-Nas television, criticized the film's depiction of Muhammad. Egyptian President Mohamed Morsi urged the United States government to prosecute the film producers whom he referred to as "madmen". The U.S. Embassy in Cairo issued a statement condemning what it called "continuing efforts by misguided individuals to hurt the religious feelings of Muslims," an apparent reference to the video.

The showings of the film's trailer resulted in massive and sometimes violent protests and deaths and hundreds of injuries in several cities in the world. The government of Pakistan declared a national holiday in honour of the Prophet and called for peaceful protests against the film. On September 17, about 500,000 Lebanese protested in Beirut at a rally where Hezbollah leader Hassan Nasrallah made a rare public appearance, calling for sustained protests against the film, calling the protests the "start of a serious movement in defense of the prophet." American diplomats at the U.S. Embassy in Beirut began destroying classified material as a security measure.

On September 12, YouTube announced that it had "temporarily restricted access" to the video in Egypt and Libya. Afghanistan and Iran decided to censor YouTube and Afghanistan President Hamid Karzai said the makers of the film committed a "devilish act". Several news services have reported that "Bacile" has gone into hiding fearing that current actions could be used as an excuse to harm him, and that he continued to defend the film. Saying he was sorry for the death of Stevens, "Bacile" blamed the consulate's security system. Klein rejected any blame for the violent reaction to the movie, saying, "Do I feel guilty that these people were incited? Guess what? I didn't incite them. They're pre-incited, they're pre-programmed to do this."

On September 18, a female suicide bomber drove a car filled with explosives into a mini-bus with foreign aviation workers in Afghanistan, killing at least nine people, reportedly including eight South Africans and a British woman and possibly also a number of Afghans. The Islamist militant group Hezbi Islami claimed responsibility for the attack, which was the first reported suicide bombing by a woman in the country, and said it was in response to the film. The Taliban said they attacked the British military base Camp Bastion on September 14, killing two American marines, in a response to the film, and later claimed the base was chosen because Prince Harry was there.

The film has been condemned by the Coptic Orthodox Christian Church. Bishop Serapion of the Coptic Orthodox Diocese of Los Angeles said in a statement that it "rejects dragging the respectable Copts of the Diaspora in the latest production of an inflammatory movie about the prophet of Islam ... The name of our blessed parishioners should not be associated with the efforts of individuals who have ulterior motives." In addition, the World Council of Churches stated that the film was "an insult to the heart of the Muslim faith" and "to all peoples of faith."

ADL's Abraham Foxman said, "We are greatly concerned that this false notion that an Israeli Jew and 100 Jewish backers were behind the film now has legs and is gathering speed around the world. [...] In an age where conspiracy theories, especially ones of an anti-Semitic nature, explode on the Internet in a matter of minutes, it is crucial for those news organizations who initially reported on his identity to correct the record." Foxman specifically criticized "news organizations across the Arab world and anti-Semites and anti-Israel activists" for continuing to describe the filmmaker and backers as Jewish despite the fact that no Jews were involved in the making of the film.

While Bacile was neither Israeli nor Jewish, the Iranian state-linked Press TV cited the initial reports for the film. Iran's supreme leader, Ali Khamenei, evoked "evil Zionists" and the United States for creating the film. Rabbi Abraham Cooper condemned initial reports that the film was backed by Jewish donors and said that the media did not thoroughly research this claim. Cooper said that to "catapult what might be a nonexistent Jewish element could lead to violence against Jews," and called on the media to learn from this incident, while investigating who exactly created the film.

Sky News said the video was "anti-Muslim" and "designed to enrage". According to Reuters, the video portrays Muhammad as a "fool, a philanderer and a religious fake"; NBC News said the trailer depicted Muhammad "as a womanizer, a homosexual and a child abuser." Time magazine described the dialogue during the scene with a donkey as "homoerotic". According to the BBC, Muhammad's followers are portrayed as "savage killers hungry for wealth and bent on killing women and children."

The New Republic said that the film "includes not a single artistically redeemable aspect" with "atrocious" directing, "terrible" sets and acting consisting of "blank eyes and strained line readings". The New York Daily News called it an "obscenely inept vanity project" that is "far beneath any reasonable standard of movie-making." Muslim filmmaker Kamran Pasha stated, "I am of the opinion that it is a film of questionable artistic merit, backed by a group of bitter bigots whose only agenda was to incite hatred and violence by smearing the character of Prophet Muhammad." Salman Rushdie called the filmmaker "outrageous and unpleasant and disgusting", and characterized the production as "clearly a malevolent piece of garbage."

== List of protests ==
=== Africa ===
Nation	Cities	Information
Kenya	Mombasa	The Council of Imams and Preachers of Kenya organized a demonstration of about 100 people in Mombasa in protest against the film.
Mauritius	Port Louis	Hizb-Ut-Tahrir, an Islamic Cultural Association organized a peaceful march to protest against the spread of this film. The march, which was attended by about fifty people, began at the SSR Botanical Garden in Port Louis to the Office of the Embassy of the United States House. Fadlur Rahman, the leader of Hizb-Ut-Tahrir submitted a letter to the U.S. embassy in which he requests to block access to this film on the Internet.
Nigeria	Jos; Sokoto; Kano; Kaduna	Top Nigerian Muslim clerics condemned the film, but advised against demonstrations. "Such actions are orchestrated by the enemies of peace to bring about chaos which must be condemned by religious leaders all over the world". Nevertheless, security forces around the country were on alert for trouble. Protests were held in Jos and Sokoto. On September 22, "tens of thousands" of demonstrators led by the Islamic Movement of Nigeria in Kano. On September 24, thousands of people protested in Kaduna.
Niger	Zinder	The Niger Islamic Council has repudiated the film that has caused mass riots and called for Christian churches to be spared in the protests. However, hundreds of protesters stormed and ransacked a Catholic cathedral in Zinder and burned American and British flags. One policeman was injured and about a dozen protesters were arrested.
Somalia	Mogadishu	Nearly a thousand people protested the film in Mogadishu, Somalia.
South Africa	Johannesburg	About 4,000 people gathered near the U.S. Consulate in Johannesburg. The protesters demanded the U.S. government to issue a public apology over the film and called for the punishment of those behind the film. The South African government earlier banned demonstrations near the U.S. embassy.
Sudan	Khartoum	Several hundred protesters from a group called "Sudanese Youth" gathered outside of the U.S. embassy in Khartoum on September 12. The embassy met with three protesters, who delivered written demands asking for an apology and the removal of the YouTube video.
Tanzania	Zanzibar City	Demonstrations were held in Kidongo Chekundu, Zanzibar City on September 21.
Uganda	Kampala	Pakistani businessmen in Kampala protested and paralyzed business. Several business around the city remained closed.

=== Americas ===
Nation	Cities	Information
Brazil	São Paulo; Rio de Janeiro	About 500–600 people, including mostly members of the local Syrian, Lebanese and Palestinian communities but also many non-Muslims, especially Roman Catholics and Jews promoting religious tolerance, held demonstrations in São Paulo, where Hassan Gharib, among the organizers of the protest march, stated that the anti-Islam movie was produced "to incite a dispute between Muslims and Christians" but this will not happen since "the Muslims and the Christians are brothers; we come from the same source." Protests were also held in Rio de Janeiro. A court order was issued in São Paulo demanding the video to be removed from YouTube.
Canada	Calgary; Toronto	More than 100 people held demonstrations at Calgary's City Hall. Mahdi Qasqas with the Muslim Council of Calgary says that the protest does not only concern about the latest anti-Islam film. "This is not the only hate-filled, hate-speech video that's out there — there are many," Quaqas said. "Hate is not just a phenomena [sic] that's related to Muslims. It's related to all minorities all non-dominant population groups and we're here to stop all of that." On September 22, about 1,500 held demonstrations outside the U.S. Consulate in Toronto.
United States	Dearborn; Canton; New York; Chicago; Philadelphia; Washington, D.C.	Protesters gathered in the Islamic Center of America in Dearborn on September 22 and is claimed to be the first protest in America. The protest did not only condemn the film but also the extreme response in the Muslim world. Protests were also organized in nearby Canton on September 29. Protesters demonstrated outside the United Nations building in New York on September 28. Similar protests were reported in Chicago and Philadelphia. There were also demonstrations held in front of the White House.

=== Central, South and East Asia ===
Nation	Cities	Information
Afghanistan	Jalalabad; Kabul	A demonstration of about 1,000 people was held against the film in Jalalabad. The protesters burned an effigy of U.S. President Barack Obama.
Azerbaijan	Baku; Nardaran	Nearly 100 people protested against the film in Baku. They were prevented from reaching the US embassy by police who arrested some 30 protestors, and beat several others. Protest were also held in Nardaran.
Bangladesh	Dhaka; Chittagong	1,000 members of the Bangladesh Khilafat Andolan group demonstrated and attempted to march on the U.S. embassy in Dhaka, though they were stopped from approaching the embassy by police. There were no reports of violence. Many more protests were held in Dhaka with the protests on September 21 seeing approximately 10,000 people. Protesters in Chittagong also torched a bus and a police van. Three students were arrested according to the police. A nationwide strike was held on September 23.
China	Hong Kong	Nearly three thousand protesters demonstrated in Hong Kong on September 24.
India	Srinagar; Chennai; Puducherry	Demonstrations were held in Srinagar, Kashmir, as local imams denounced the film saying "It is our right to protest against this heinous act aimed at hurting the sentiments of the Muslims. However, we should not indulge in vandalism as we will causing harm to our own property. We shall remain peaceful." During a protest that started on September 14 and continued for three days, U.S. consulate at Chennai was pelted with stones breaking some window panes, allegedly by members of the Muslim NGO Tamil Nadu Muslim Munnetra Kazhagam and as a result, the issuing of visas by the consulate was cancelled for two days. Google started blocking access of the video on YouTube from Indian IP addresses at the request of the government of India. Attempts to view the video will result in the message "This content is not available in your country due to a government removal request." Protests were held in front of the French consulate in Puducherry. The protesters criticized U.S. and France.
Indonesia	Jakarta; Medan; Makassar; Surabaya	An anti-American and anti-Israeli demonstration was held outside the embassy in Jakarta by about 200 protesters. Similar protests were held in Medan, Makassar and Surabaya.
Japan	Tokyo	About 300 people, with many coming from Myanmar and Pakistan, held demonstrations in the Shibuya district in Tokyo over the anti-Muslim film on September 21. The protests were originally meant to draw the attention to the condition of Rohingya Muslims in Myanmar but ended up focusing on criticizing the United States. Organizers were planning another protest on Friday, September 28.
Kyrgyzstan	Bishkek	Around 100 people held demonstrations in Bishkek on September 25, which lasted less than 30 minutes.
Malaysia	Kuala Lumpur; Batu Caves; Ipoh	A protest was held by a group of about 30 Muslims representing various Islamic organizations at the American embassy in Kuala Lumpur. Protests were also held at Batu Caves and in the northern city of Ipoh.
Maldives	Malé	Protests were held outside the United Nations building in the capital city of Malé in the Maldives over the anti-Islam film. About 200 to 400 protesters were present in the demonstrations. A private newspaper reported the protesters also set fire to an American flag outside the UN building.
Nepal	Kathmandu	Demonstrations were held in Kathmandu which condemns the film and calls for U.S. authorities to investigate the authors of the film.
Pakistan	Islamabad; Peshawar; Karachi; Swat; Lahore; Multan; Mardan	Ghulam Ahmad Bilour, Minister of Railways, offered a $100,000 award for killing the maker of the film. However, Pakistani prime minister and Bilour's party condemned his remarks. Protests were held at the U.S. embassy in Islamabad and in Peshawar, Karachi, and Swat by the Jamaat-e-Islami, and in Multan by Jamiat Talba Arbia and Shehri Mahaz. In Lahore, demonstration was held by Tehreek-e-Hurmat-e-Rasool and 10,000 people protested against the film, despite a ban on rallies. One Pakistani died from smoke inhalation emanating from burning American flags at the rally. On September 13, Altaf Hussain, chief of Muttahida Qaumi Movement, sent a telegram to US President, US Secretary of State, Secretary General of United Nations, and Secretary General of OIC in which he demanded that the movie should be banned immediately as it has hurt the feelings of over one billion Muslims throughout the world. On September 21, around 1,500 of people broke through the gates of St Paul's Lutheran Church in Mardan. September 22 was declared as a public holiday, 'Yaum-e-Ishq-e-Mustafa' meanings the day for the love of Mustafa, and whole Pakistan protested before and after the Jumma prayer. Hundreds of Christians protested in Sahiwal to condemn the film on September 23.
Philippines	Marawi; Manila	On September 15, more than 300 protesters organized in Marawi, Lanao del Sur over the film and burned American flags. There were threats to kill Nakoula Basseley Nakoula, who is believed to be behind the controversial film. American interest remained unharmed in the province. The largest Muslim insurgent group Moro Islamic Liberation Front urged Filipino Muslims not to resort to violence. More than 3,000 protesters organized another demonstrations in Marawi, Lanao del Sur over the film and burned American flags on September 17. About 300 protesters also protested on September 24 near the U.S. embassy in Manila calling for a ban on the film. The protest leaders also said that they would file a petition to the Supreme Court of the Philippines for a ban of the posting of the film on the internet. The Supreme Court granted the petition to block the film the day after the protests in Manila.
Singapore		There were no violent protests; however on September 20, 2012, Google started blocking access to the video on YouTube for Singaporean IP addresses, although it cannot be found from the search bar.
South Korea	Seoul	About 155 Muslim protesters held demonstrations near the U.S. embassy in Seoul and at the Seoul Plaza to protest the film on September 19. The protesters also burned Israeli and American flags as part of the protests.
Sri Lanka	Colombo	About 2000 protesters held demonstrations near the U.S. embassy in Colombo in protest of the film on September 21. The protesters also burned effigies of U.S. President Obama and American flags as part of the protests. Thousands of protesters marched towards the embassy calling for a ban on American brand names in protests of the film.
Thailand	Bangkok; Phuket	About 400 people held demonstrations against the film outside the U.S. embassy in Bangkok. Protests were also held in Phuket on September 27.
Turkey	Istanbul	Hundreds gathered at Beyazit Square in Istanbul in a peaceful demonstration against the film called by the Turkish Felicity Party (a.k.a. Saadet Party), a marginal conservative party not represented in the Turkish parliament. Turkish Prime Minister Recep Tayyip Erdoğan called on the international community to recognize Islamophobia as a crime against humanity. He also said: "Legal and peaceful protest by Muslims is a useful and correct thing; but a protest cannot envisage any kind of violence or terrorism".

=== Europe ===
Nation	Cities	Information
Belgium	Antwerp	Demonstrations were held in Antwerp in response to the anti-Islam film on September 16. The protestors chanted anti-U.S. slogans and burned an American flag. The Belgian police detained 230 people, a leader of the Islamist group Sharia4Belgium is among those detained.
Czechia	Prague	A protest of around 1,000 Muslims was held in front of the U.S. embassy in Prague and at Wenceslas Square on 16 September.
France	Paris	Over 100 arrested in protest of an anti-Islam film outside the U.S. embassy in Paris. On Saturday afternoon September 15, 2012, up to 250 protesters gathered around the U.S. embassy in Paris responding to a call put out on Facebook, police officer Pierre Coric said. In addition, the satirical magazine Charlie Hebdo published caricatures of Muhammad, several of which depicted him as naked, causing the French government to increase security at certain French embassies and close the embassies in about 20 countries, and riot police surrounded the offices of the magazine to protect against possible attacks. The magazine was firebombed in 2011 after an edition mocked Islamic extremism. The French government banned a planned protest that was due to be held on September 22 in the Grand Mosque of Paris. Violators of the ban shall spend 6 months of imprisonment and fined 700 euros.
Germany	Freiburg; Muenster; Dortmund	Protests were held by around 1,000 people in Freiburg and Muenster on September 21. About 1,500 people also held demonstrations in Dortmund on September 22.
Greece	Athens	On September 23, hundreds of Muslims protested at the American embassy, some throwing stones, bottles and shoes at the building. Muslim inmates at a local prison lit beds on fire in solidarity with the demonstrations.
Ireland	Dublin	Hundreds of protesters protested near Google's European Headquarters in Dublin demanded removal of the video the protesters also targeted the U.S. embassy in Dublin.
Italy	Rome	Thousands of protesters held demonstrations near the U.S. embassy in Rome on September 21.
Republic of Macedonia	Skopje	Over 100 protesters gathered around the city mosque in Skopje on September 21.
Malta		In an unprecedented move, Imam Mohammad El Sadi prohibited Muslims in Malta to hold protests.
Netherlands	Amsterdam	The American consulate in Amsterdam closed earlier than usual on September 14 in anticipation of a protest. A peaceful demonstration of around 30 people took place on the Dam Square in the center of Amsterdam. Dutch politician Geert Wilders linked the YouTube video Innocence of Muslims to his website. Shortly after it became known that Wilders had put the video online, his own website and that of the Party for Freedom became unreachable. Geert Wilders motivated his action by stating "Defending freedom of expression is the greatest good. Everyone should do that as a signal that violence is not accepted and is not working."
Norway	Oslo	Around 6,000 Muslims took part in a demonstration at Youngstorget on 21 September. Another protest was held simultaneously by around 150 members of the salafist Profetens Ummah, led by Ubaydullah Hussain and Arfan Bhatti outside the U.S. embassy, chanting "Obama, Obama, we love Osama!". One person was detained by the police.
Poland	Warsaw	A demonstration of 350 Muslims was held in the Warsaw city centre on September 22, while simultaneously 50 Muslims protested outside the U.S. embassy.
Russia	Kazan	Russia plans to block access to YouTube if Google fails to remove the film following a court order, according to Communications Minister Nikolay Nikiforov. Demonstrations were held in Kazan, Tatarstan on September 26. October 1, a Moscow district court found the film to be extremist. but Russia's Human Rights Ombudsman Vladimir Lukin says he will not oppose the ban.
Serbia	Novi Pazar	In Novi Pazar, the Torcida Sandžak group organized a protest in the form of a public march which was attended by thousands of people. The protest was held in a peaceful manner without negative incidents.
Switzerland	Bern	Protesters organized by the Islamic Central Council of Switzerland were held in Bern on September 23. The organizer president, Nikola Blawnshow blamed U.S. officials for producing the film. He also criticized the French government for banning protests against the film while at the same time allowing Charlie Hebdo magazine, to publish cartoon depictions of Muhammad. The YouTube video was blocked access by the Ministry of Transport and Communication upon a court ruling.
Ukraine	Simferopol	Demonstrations were held in Simferopol in the Ukrainian autonomous Republic of Crimea.
United Kingdom	London; Birmingham; Cardiff; Bradford	A demonstration of 200 people gathered outside the U.S. embassy in London, burning the U.S. and Israeli flags. A smaller protest involving around 100 people was also reported in Birmingham outside the Bullring shopping centre on September 21. Around 100 Muslim protesters held a demonstration in Cardiff, displaying placards including 'USA burn in hell' and 'Islam for France'. The demonstration was organised by Abu Hajar, a member of Islamic Path, a group that is listed as a proscribed terrorist organisation by the Home Office, the UK government office for the interior. There were no reports of violence. Protests were also held in Bradford. On 6 October thousands of Muslims protested under the supervision of Muhammad Alauddin Siddiqui outside the Parliament of London.

=== Middle East and North Africa ===
Nation	Cities	Information
Algeria	Kouba	A demonstration of about 60 people were held in the town of Kouba. The protesters chanted slogans praising Islam and Muhammad and rejected Islamophobia and insults to religious symbols.
Bahrain	Diraz	A demonstration of 2,000 protesters was held in Diraz, a focal point for Shiite opposition to the Sunni monarchy.
Egypt	Cairo	Protests were held in Cairo, outside the U.S. embassy. Egypt requested that the international organization Interpol issue an international wanted persons alert for eight people who were linked to the film, on charges of "harming the unity of the nation and defamation of the Islamic religion". Among those people is the controversial pastor, Terry Jones, who allegedly helped promote the film. Coptic Christian blogger Alber Saber was arrested on September 13 for allegedly uploading a copy of the video to his Facebook page. Though authorities later stated they had found no evidence that he had uploaded the video, they charged him with "defamation of Islam and Christianity" for other religious writings on his site. The case drew protests from numerous NGOs, and Amnesty International designated him a prisoner of conscience.
Iran	Tehran	President of Iran Mahmoud Ahmadinejad condemned the anti-Islam film in addition to the violence it caused, saying "We also believe that this must also be resolved in a humane atmosphere, in a participatory environment and we do not like anyone losing their lives or being killed for any reason, anywhere in the world". Protests occurred outside the Swiss embassy in Tehran which represents American interests in the Islamic Republic. Iranian police prevented the protesters from reaching the embassy gates, and no injuries were reported. The Iranian Foreign Ministry condemned the film as "an insult to sacred Muslim figures" while criticizing the response of the United States government. In response to the film, Hassan Sane'i, the leader of the state-linked religious foundation that originally placed a bounty on Salman Rushdie's head, increased the reward by $500,000 to whoever kills Rushdie. This increases the reward to $3.3 million, despite Rushdie having nothing to do with Innocence of Muslims and even actually condemning it. Iran announced that in protest of the film, it would boycott the 2013 Oscars.
Iraq	Sadr City; Basra; Najaf; Hillah; Samarra	Hundreds protested against the film in Baghdad's Sadr City and in Basra. A smaller crowd protested in Najaf. Protesters burned American flags, chanted "Death to America" and called on the Iraqi government to expel the American diplomats. The protests were organized by Shi'ite leader Muqtada al-Sadr and, at least in Basra, included both Sunni and Shi'ite clerics. In Hillah in the Shiite-dominated southern region, American and Israeli flags were burned. In Samarra, clerics demanded a boycott of American goods.
Israel	Tel Aviv; Acre; Jerusalem	About 50 members of the Islamic Movement in Israel protested in front the U.S. Embassy in Tel Aviv, alleging that the United States' government sponsors "little people" who hurt Islam and Muslims. There were no clashes or disturbances. In Acre, Arab protestors said that "only Islamic rule throughout the world will make peace. Jews and Christians can live without fear under the wings of Islam." Some chanted support for Osama bin Laden as well. Soon after, a few hundred Arab protestors attempted to march from the Temple Mount to the American consulate, and threw stones at police, who broke up the protest and prevented them from reaching the American consulate. On September 21, 2012, an Egyptian militant group attacked Israeli soldiers near the Egyptian–Israeli border, killing an Israeli personnel. In the ensuing gunfight between the Israeli Caracal Battalion and the militants, three militants were killed. The militant group cited the video as their motive for the attack. On October 2, 2012, a group of Israelis gathered at the United States Embassy in Tel Aviv to demonstrate support for America following diplomatic attacks and protests against America across the Arab world. Israeli and American flags were waved while signs read "Israel: America's best friend in the Middle East." One demonstrator said, "Americans should be proud of what they represent – the free world."
Jordan	Amman	In Amman, 200 Salafis demonstrated at the U.S. embassy, while 1,400 Muslim Brotherhood supporters in central Amman.
Lebanon	Beirut; Sidon	Protestors torched a Starbucks in Beirut. Over 1,000 people also held protests on September 21 in Sidon.
Kuwait	Kuwait City	An anti-American demonstration was held outside the U.S. embassy in Kuwait by about 200 protesters.
Mauritania	Nouakchott	Protests were held in the capital, Nouakchott.
Morocco	Casablanca; Salé	Agence France Press reported that 300 to 400 protesters had gathered outside the U.S. Consulate in Casablanca on September 12, amid a heavy presence of Moroccan police. The protest was non-violent, organized via social media and did not appear to be organized by a specific group. Around 200 hardline Islamists gathered in Salé, twin town to the Moroccan capital Rabat, shouting anti-U.S. slogans and burning U.S. flags.
Oman	Muscat; Salalah	About 50 protesters blockaded all roads towards the U.S. embassy in Muscat to protest against the controversial film. Protests were also held in the center of Salalah by about 50 people
Palestine	Gaza; Nablus	Protests were reported in the Gaza Strip as being called for by the Hamas government's Ministry of Religious Endowments in front of the Palestinian Legislative Council building in Gaza City. Dozens of Palestinians protested, while some burned American and Israeli flags, chanting, "Death to America! Death to Israel!" International agencies closed their offices in Gaza for a day as a precautionary measure. The following day, several hundred Palestinians across the Gaza strip protested the film, with Hamas and the smaller Islamic Jihad faction encouraging protests. In Gaza city several hundred took to the streets, burned American and Israeli flags along with an effigy of the film's producer. Several hundred people protested in Nablus in the northern West Bank and burned an American flag.
Qatar	Doha	At least 2,000 people marched towards the U.S. embassy in Doha from the Omar ibn Al-Khatab mosque alongside the Doha Expressway on September 14 denouncing the controversial film.
Saudi Arabia	Buraidah	A protest was held outside of McDonald's in Buraidah.
Syria	Damascus	A demonstration of 200 people march on the empty U.S. embassy in Damascus.
Tunisia	Tunis	The Irish Times reports that 200 protesters demonstrated in front of the United States embassy in Tunis, throwing rocks, burning the American flag and chanting slogans. They were dispersed by police with teargas and rubber bullets.
United Arab Emirates		The Telecommunication and Regulatory Authority of the UAE-commanded Etisalat and Du to block the video on YouTube and mirror sites on the September 17, 2012 as a violation of cultural norms.

=== Oceania ===
Nation	City	Information
Australia	Sydney	Demonstrators carrying signs at the Sydney protest Main article: Sydney anti-Islam film protests On September 15, 2012, up to 500 people gathered to protest against the film outside the United States Consulate General in Martin Place, Sydney, New South Wales. Demonstrators, including children, carried signs with messages such as "Behead all those who insult the Prophet". Police attempted to form a line in front of the protesters; however, the line broke which caused the demonstration to become mobile. Police used pepper spray and deployed police dogs amid violent confrontations with protesters. Six police officers, several protesters and civilians were injured, two police vehicles were also damaged in the protest. Protesters directly attacked police by throwing projectiles and assaulting officers with banners, the latter led to one officer being knocked unconscious.

== Related attacks ==
=== Afghanistan ===
Afghanistan's Taliban claimed responsibility on the Camp Bastion attack in southern Helmand Province which U.S. officials said killed two American Marines, saying it was in response to Innocence of Muslims. Camp Bastion, in southern Helmand province, came under mortar, rocket-propelled grenade and small arms fire late on September 14. Nearly 20 insurgents disguised as US troops breached the base and destroyed several hangars and fueling facilities. Before they were all killed or captured, the insurgents also managed to destroy six jet fighters and damage two others.

A suicide bomber killed 14 people on September 18. A spokesman for an Afghan insurgent group, Hezbi Islami, claimed responsibility for the bombing and said it was carried out by an 18-year-old woman "in response to the film insulting the Prophet Muhammad and Islam."

In Afghanistan, the Dadullah faction of the Afghan Taliban has put a bounty of 8 kilograms of gold, worth about $487,000 for the death of the film's creators.

=== Egypt–Israel border attack ===
On September 21, 2012, an Egyptian militant group attacked Israeli soldiers near the Egypt–Israel border, killing one Israeli. In the ensuing gunfight between the Israeli Caracal Battalion and the militants, three militants were killed. The militant group cited the video as their motive for the attack.

== Reactions to diplomatic missions attacks ==
Various nations have released statements in response to the attacks and to Innocence of Muslims. These comments variously included condemnation of the attacks and condemnations of the video. The president of the United States, Barack Obama, addressed the dilemma by giving a speech after the protests and attacks, where he showed his respect toward Islam and tried to advocate for mutual respect. However, Obama also stated that America will not tolerate any acts of terror.

== See also ==
- 2011 Mazar-i-Sharif attack
- Chronology of the reactions to Innocence of Muslims
- List of attacks on diplomatic missions
- Sydney anti-Islam film protests
