= Imran Firasat =

- Born: 1978 (age 46–47); Pakistan
- Occupation: Filmmaker
- Known for: Criticism of Islam

Imran Firasat (born 1978) is a Pakistani Islam-critical filmmaker. Born in a Muslim family, he renounced Islam and converted to Christianity. He lives in Spain, and has been described as a part of the counter-jihad movement.

== Biography ==
=== Early life and activities ===
Firasat was born into a Muslim family in the Islamic Republic of Pakistan. After moving in with his Buddhist wife, he says he faced harassment, and was detained by police who tortured him. The couple fled to Spain as a result, obtaining political asylum in 2006. There, he began blogging and giving interviews denouncing Islam.

He then started getting death threats and was physically assaulted. He subsequently fled to his wife's home country of Indonesia in 2010, where he was detained over alleged blasphemy against Islam. He was then deported by Indonesian police and again returned to Spain. His police record includes an Indonesian warrant for murder. He rejects the murder charge saying that it was made up due to his criticism of Islam.

=== The Innocent Prophet ===
Following the 2012 Benghazi attack, Firasat made the documentary The Innocent Prophet in partnership with American Quran-burning pastor Terry Jones. The movie among other things asks whether Mohammed "was a child molester and a murderer." The governments of Belgium, France and the US expressed their concern over the ramifications the release of the video could produce. A Madrid court banned the release of the film, and Spain rescinded his asylum status on "grounds of a threat to the security of the state" as a result, stating that Firasat would be arrested if the film was shown.

=== Aisha and Muhammad ===
In July 2014, a new animated film that he co-produced with Danish Lars Hedegaard entitled Aisha and Muhammad was released. The film focuses on the life of the Islamic prophet Muhammad and his marriage to the six-year-old Aisha. Days later he travelled to Norway to seek asylum, but was detained and deported back to Spain based on the Dublin Regulation. He was arrested in Spain until he was released in December 2014.

== See also ==
- Innocence of Muslims
