= Al-Nas TV =

Television channel of Egypt

Al-Nas
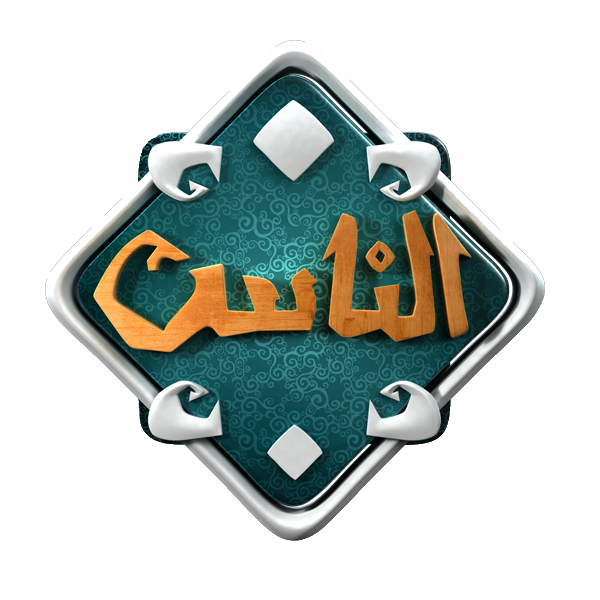
- Country: Egypt
- Broadcast area: Middle East
- Headquarters: Cairo, Egypt

History
- Launched: January 2006 (original); 17 April 2015 (relaunch)
- Closed: 3 July 2013 (original)

Al-Nas (Arabic: قناة الناس) (also spelt El-Nas or Alnas and Elnas, meaning "The People Channel") is an Egyptian television station founded in January 2006 and broadcast from Cairo until the 2013 Egyptian coup d'état. Before shutdown, it was one of the most popular channels in Egypt. As of 2015, Al-Nas has been relaunched.

Founded by Saudi investor Mansour bin Kadsa (alt. Mansur Bin Kadasah), Al-Nas began as a channel mostly for Arabic pop songs and dream interpretation shows. After a few months, Al-Nas shifted its focus to religious contents that targeted audiences who seeks religious knowledge, with numbers of high-profile Salafi preachers featured daily on various religious shows.

El-Nas (and other Salafi TV stations) were accused by human rights organisations for hosting Islamist sheikhs and preachers that encouraged anti-Shi'ism and sectarian violence in Egypt.

== Controversies ==
=== Innocence of Muslims movie ===
El-Nas drew worldwide attention in September 2012, when host Sheikh Khalad Abdalla played a clip of Innocence of Muslims a few days prior to the 2012 diplomatic missions attacks.

=== Female presenters and music ===
With supporting arguments from proper Islamic guidelines, scholars Muhammad Hussein Yacoub and Abu Ishaq Al Heweny (alt. Shaykh Abu-Ishaq al-Huwayni), both of whom used to appear on the channel, have worked to ban successfully all female presenters from the channel. The latter person has also advocated with the removal of music from being played on Al-Nas.

=== Shia lynchings in Giza ===
After more than 3,000 mobsters surrounded and torched the houses of a small Shia community in a suburb of Giza in Egypt on 23 June 2013, and brutally lynched and subsequently desecrated the corpses of four Shia Muslim men, including the prominent cleric Hasan Shehata, El-Nas ran interviews with sympathisers and inciters of the shocking hate crime during which they justified the extreme violence on the basis of purely subjective and unverified claims that carried no criminal charge under the Egyptian law. In its report, Amnesty International noted that the most recent incitement of violence against the Shia Muslim minority in Egypt prior to the incident took place at a Muslim Brotherhood rally "in support of the Syrian uprising" a week earlier attended by extremist Salafi sheikhs as well as the Egyptian President Mohamed Morsi. Commenting on the incident, Amnesty said "local residents had reported Salafi and other Islamist groups inciting hatred and violence against the Shi’a community over the past few weeks, including during Friday sermons, where they distributed pamphlets calling for their expulsion from the area" and criticised Morsi for “fail[ing] to disassociate himself and his government from the hatred and incitement against Shi’as.” During the conference held on 16 June, the report observed, top Salafi Sheikhs “used sectarian and inflammatory language to condemn attacks against Sunnis in Syria’s armed conflict.” In his own controversial condemnation of the attacks, Morsi had ignored the sectarian nature of the violence in Egypt, which has seen unprecedented levels of the persecution of ethnic and religious minorities, including Coptic Christians and Shia Moslems, after the Muslim Brotherhood took power in 2012.

== Before being sold in 2015 ==
A year before the closure of the channel, there was a trend to change the channel to a public channel, and this has already been done since Dr. Hassan Alwan, the media expert, took over the management of the channel and developed the channel in terms of the general shape of the screen and the content, and a dispute occurred between him and some of the currents rejecting the idea that had dominated the channel for the past six years Hassan Alwan announced this in the Egyptian newspapers and reported on social media at that time that the El-Nas is from now a public channel and not religious, and began to hold cooperation protocols between the channel and government media institutions, including the protocol of cooperation between the People's Channel, Dar Al-Maaref, October Magazine, and so on. Juttah comprehensive software includes Altrebeoah, medical and entertainment programs, kitchen and programs talk show daily morning program came under the name Tala'a Al-Nahar and the last evening under the name of Masr El Gedida (meaning Heliopolis in Arabic), the viewership of the channel and consequently the advertisements of the major companies increased, but the channel was like the rest of the religious channels and was closed because it is still classified as religious.

Before the channel turns into a flower dye and is sold and according to what is mentioned on the channel's website, the channel (depends on covering its expenses on advertisements and sponsorships for programs and communications and does not accept any donations). The channel has sparked criticism from Al-Azhar and media men, accusing the channel and calling it of not being eligible to issue fatwas because they did not study religion in Al-Azhar, but rather as a free study, describing them as "non-specialists." During the second half of 2010, Nilesat Corporation for operating satellite channels announced the closure of a number of satellite channels and sending warnings to another number on the pretext of "promoting violence, racial hatred, antichrist and myth." During that campaign, on October 12, 2010, the Egyptian government cut the transmission of El-Nas and the rest of the package channels on the Egyptian satellite Nilesat "temporarily" as stated by the Egyptian Minister of Information, until "their conditions are reconciled to the approval of media covenants" and the closure was without prior notice, as the channel administration said While the government said that the channel was warned in advance. The channel was closed July 3, 2013 and it is one of the most famous programs presenters on the channel at the time that it was directed by its predecessors, Mohammed Hassan, Muhammad Hussein Yaqoub, Abu Ishaq Al-Hwaini, Mahmoud Al-Masry, Ahmed Amer, Muhammad Jibril, Hazem Salah Abu Ismail, Wajdi Ghoneim, Safwat Hijazi, Ayed Al-Qarni Muhammad Musaad Yakout, Abd al-Rahman al-Sawy and Khaled Abdullah, and she broadcasts a set of programs such as “Fadda’ah” which is being rotated by a group of presenters on the channel, and the “Dialogs of Sheikh Ya`qub” program presented by Muhammad Hussein Ya`qub, and Muhammad Hassan has presented programs such as “End events”. And “Diseases of the Nation,” also known as “Donia and Deen,” “The Path to Heaven,” and “Messages to Young People.” The channel also offers children's and advertising programs for products such as electrical appliances, clothing, household items, and medicines. Sheikh Abu Ishaq Al-Huwaini stipulated that broadcasters should not appear in the programs, and that music should not be banned from the channel. The channel stopped using music, while broadcasters limited their appearance to commercial advertisements, and after that, the Board of Directors decided in August 2006 to permanently dispense with the female component On the channel, it is reported that an uproar was raised in the Egyptian and Arab media at the time about this decision.

== After selling the channel and relaunching ==
According to the announcement of the new El-Nas channel, the most prominent presenter of the programs in the channel are Dr. Muhammad Wahdan, Dr. Al-Shahat Al-Azazi, Dr. Ali Fakhr, Sheikh Awaida Othman, Sheikh Muhammad Al-Doumi, Sheikh Abdel-Khaleq Al-Atifi, Dr. Amr Al-Wardani, Dr. Muhammad Wissam, and Sheikh Ahmed Mamdouh, And Sheikh Muhammad Yahya al-Kettani.

The channel also changed its slogan. After its slogan before Muhammad Morsi's sacking was "El-Nas... a channel that takes you to heaven", its slogan is now with the new start "from people .. and to people" and "with you through all time" and "Sahih al-Din and Islam" "These are all slogans chosen by the management of the new El-Nas to be the beginning of its new launch. El-Nas TV accused, along with other channels, that it incited incitement to violence during the period in which the Brotherhood ruled Egypt, and caused many incidents of chaos, which made a number of experts confirm that its closure was due to the tone used.
