= Sydney riots =

Sydney riots may refer to:

- Sydney Riot of 1879, at a cricket match between England and New South Wales
- 2004 Redfern riots, in an inner Sydney suburb following the death of TJ Hickey
- 2005 Macquarie Fields riots, in southwestern Sydney
- 2005 Cronulla riots, a race riot in Sydney's southern suburbs
- 2012 Sydney Islamic riots, in response to the video Innocence of Muslims
- 2024 Wakely Church Stabbing Riots, in response to a livestream in which a 16 year old stabbed a bishop in Sydney's west.
