= Morris Sadek =

Coptic–American activist

Morris Sadek (born December 12, 1942) is a Coptic-American lawyer and activist who reportedly brought YouTube video Innocence of Muslims to the attention of the Arabic-speaking world, where it was denounced by protesters at American embassies and consulates.

== Biography ==
Sadek's Egyptian citizenship was previously revoked for promoting the invasion of Egypt and attacking Islam. A vocal opponent of Islam, he holds counter-jihadist views, and reportedly protested the Ground Zero Mosque on September 11, 2010, with crucifix, Bible, and American flag, stating that "Islam is evil". On September 6, 2012, he is reported to have sent out mails to journalists containing the link to the 14-minute version of the film Innocence of Muslims.

Sadek has been President of the small National American Coptic Assembly, and boasts to be a friend of Quran-burning pastor Terry Jones. According to the Coptic community Sadek is a fringe figure. Cynthia Farahat, Coptic Solidarity's director of advocacy, has said that Sadek "has done a lot of harmful things for Copts in Egypt," and that "Every single thing he says is used by Islamists to justify terrorism against Copts."
