= Sydney anti-Islam film protests =

Protest against anti-Islamic film

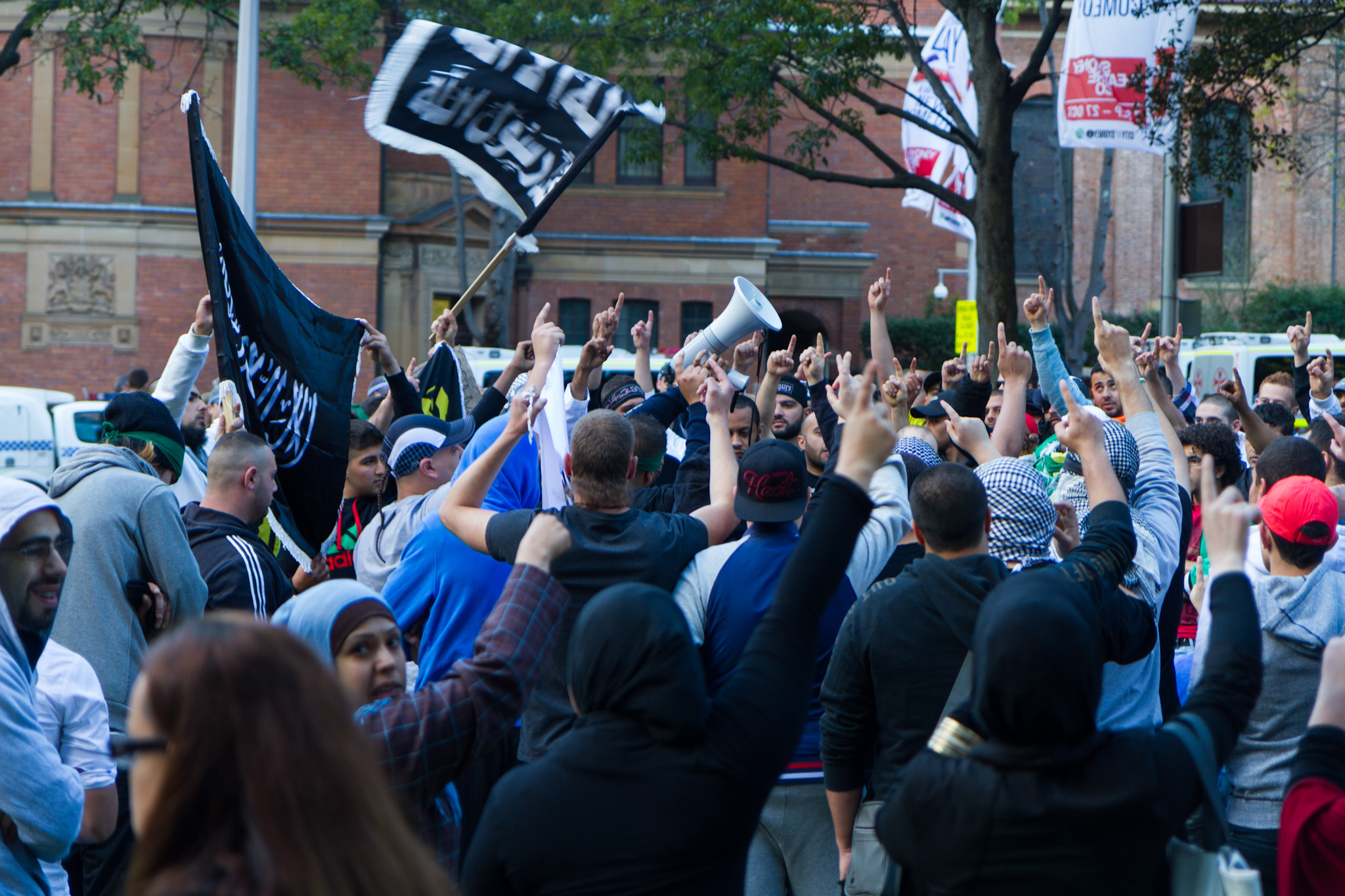
- Location: Martin Place, Hyde Park, Pitt Street Mall; Sydney, New South Wales, Australia
- Date: 15 September 2012
- Injuries: 19 protesters injured 6 police injured
- Charges: 8 arrested

On 15 September 2012, a protest against the anti-Islamic film Innocence of Muslims was held in Sydney, New South Wales. While the protest started peacefully, violent confrontations between police and protesters began when protesters reached the United States Consulate General. In resulting clashes, six police officers and 19 protesters were injured. The violence was condemned by Australian political leaders, including Prime Minister Julia Gillard, as well as by mainstream Muslim organizations in Australia. Police arrested nine protesters in connection with the violence.

The riot, through Pitt Street pedestrian mall and Martin Place, temporarily shut down parts of the city, instilling fear in members of the public (interviewed by live television crews), and was later brought under control by police.

== Protest ==
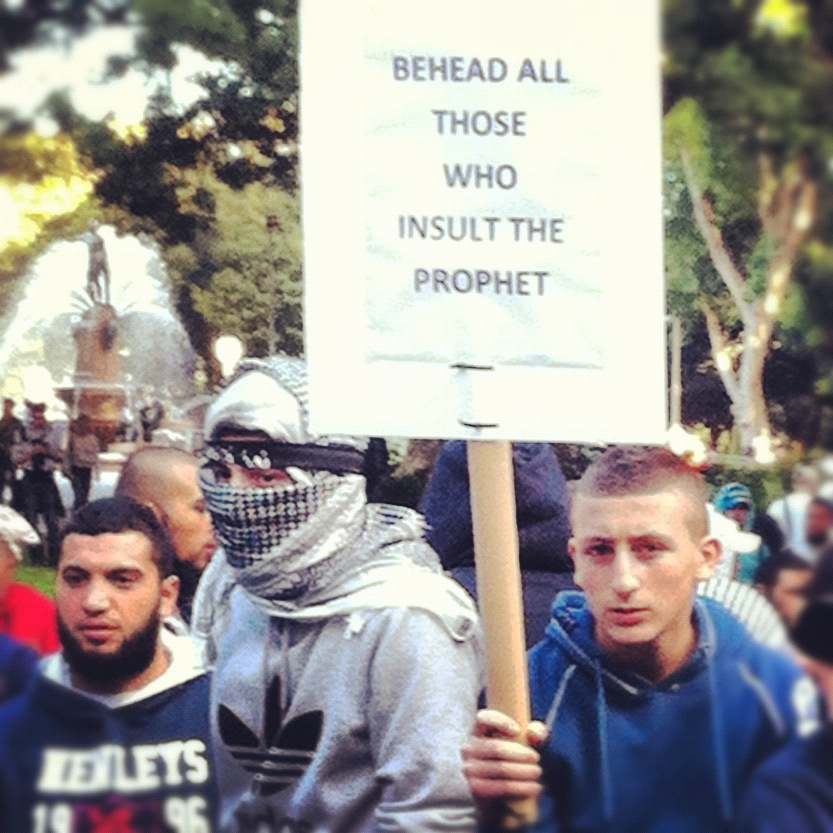
A protester carries a sign reading "behead all those who insult the prophet".

The protest started at about midday when approximately 100 people gathered at the Sydney Town Hall before marching along George Street to Martin Place where the US Consulate is located. Conflict between the protesters and the police started when the former tried to enter the US Consulate. The police used capsicum spray to push the protesters back from the consulate. According to one protester this aggravated the crowd, as many had brought their children.

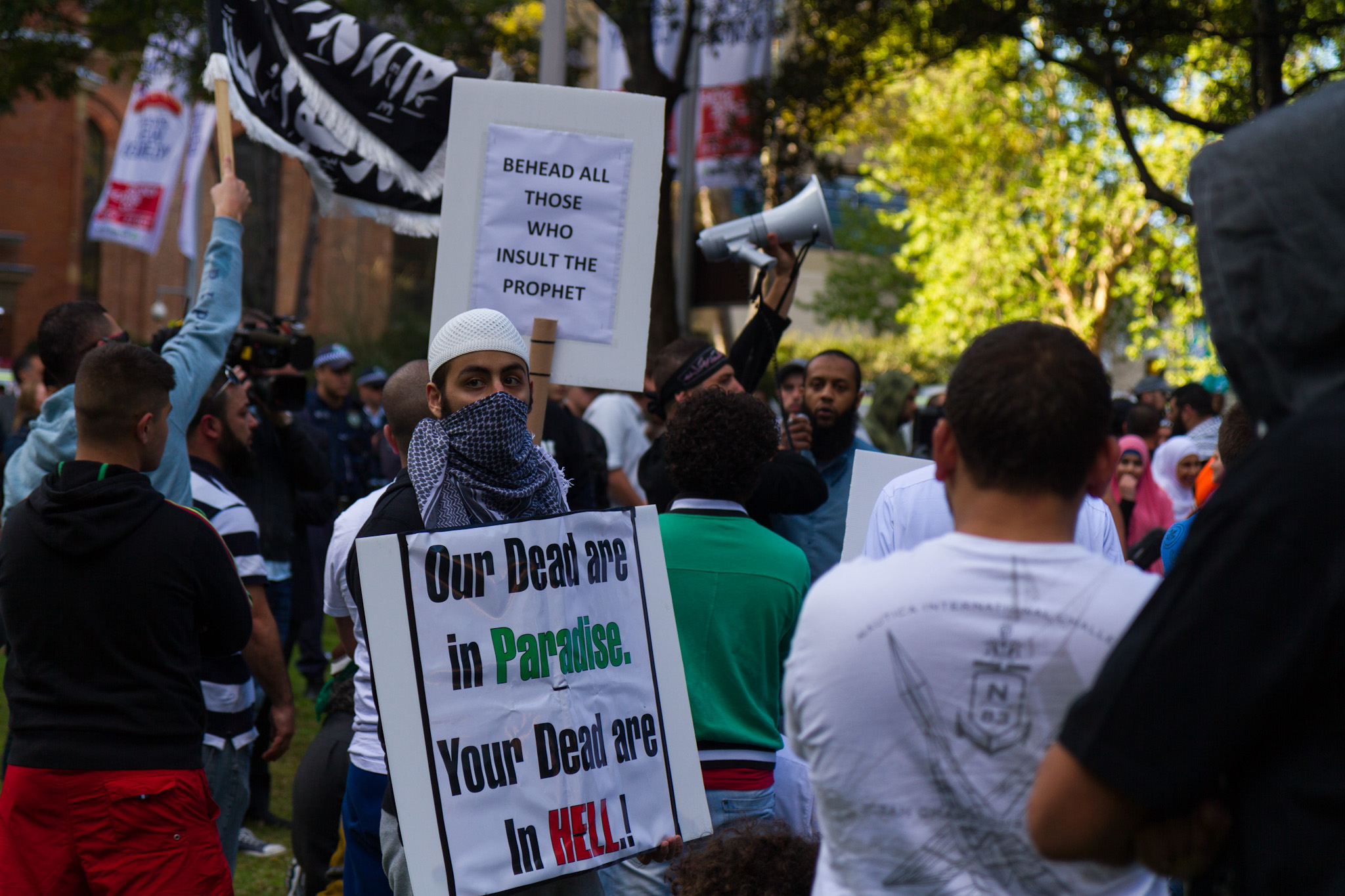
Signs carried at the riot

The crowd then moved to Hyde Park, where around 300 people had gathered. Further clashes erupted as police used capsicum spray on protesters who at times threw bottles at police. Protesters chanted "Down, down USA" and carried Sunni Islamist flags and signs saying, "Behead all those who insult the prophet", "Our dead are in paradise, your dead are in hell", "Shariah will dominate the world", and "Obama Obama, we love Osama" and threw bottles and objects retrieved from construction sites at police officers. The police responded by spraying capsicum spray into the crowd. Six police officers were injured of which two were hospitalized.

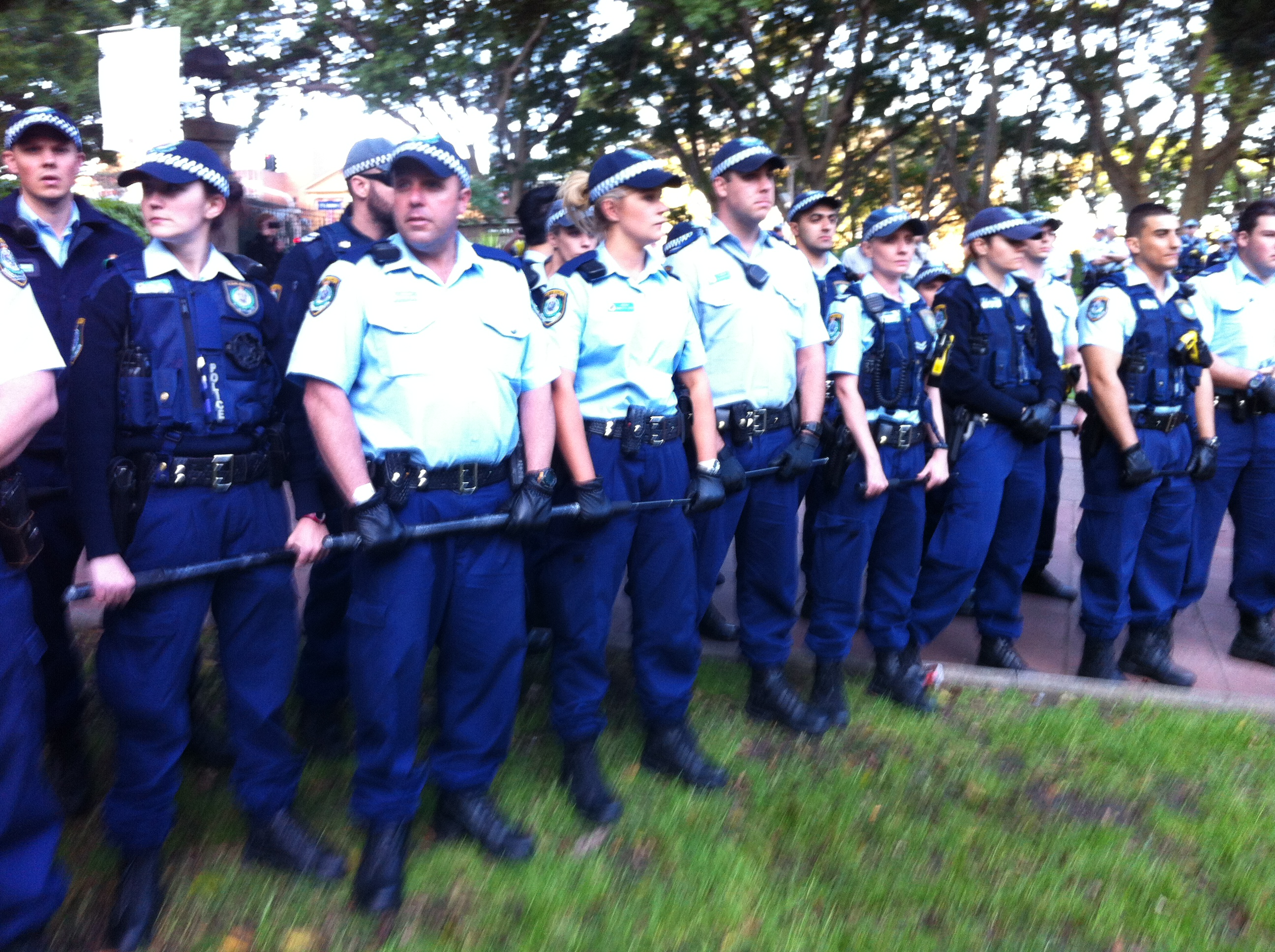
Police form a line in Hyde Park.

As the crowd started to leave Hyde Park near St James, Public Order and Riot Squad officers equipped with batons and riot shields had already been stationed at the park exit. Protestors continued to throw stones, sticks and bottles at the police. Riot and mounted police pursued protesters down William Street towards Kings Cross. The already splintered crowd then broke up further, running through the back streets of Darlinghurst with police chasing after them.

Police blocked several CBD streets, including the intersection of Martin Place and Castlereagh Street, parts of George Street and Market Street while protestors attempted to move through the city.

== Arrests and investigation ==
Nine men were arrested. Police continued to investigate the event using photographs published by news networks to identify people who attended the protest, stating that not all those caught on camera were guilty of offences, but might be able to help identify those who had acted violently. The Counter Terrorism Squad reported that they had identified a number of men known to have criminal convictions, although not necessarily linked to terrorist groups. Mohammed Issai Issaka was convicted for riot and assaulting police, and after losing an appeal, was jailed in April 2014. Others received suspended sentences for affray and resisting arrest, fines or good behaviour bonds for offenses ranging from assault, damaging property, to offensive language.

== Media coverage ==
The Australian reported that several of the protestors were carrying the black flags of an organisation described as al-Qa'ida sympathisers. An unnamed Muslim leader was quoted in the paper as saying that the protest had been hijacked by a group known as "Sixth Pillar", the name being a reference to the "Five Pillars of Islam" with jihad being claimed by some to be the "sixth pillar of Islam". The group may be linked to the controversial Sydney Sheikh Feiz Mohammed.

== Reactions ==
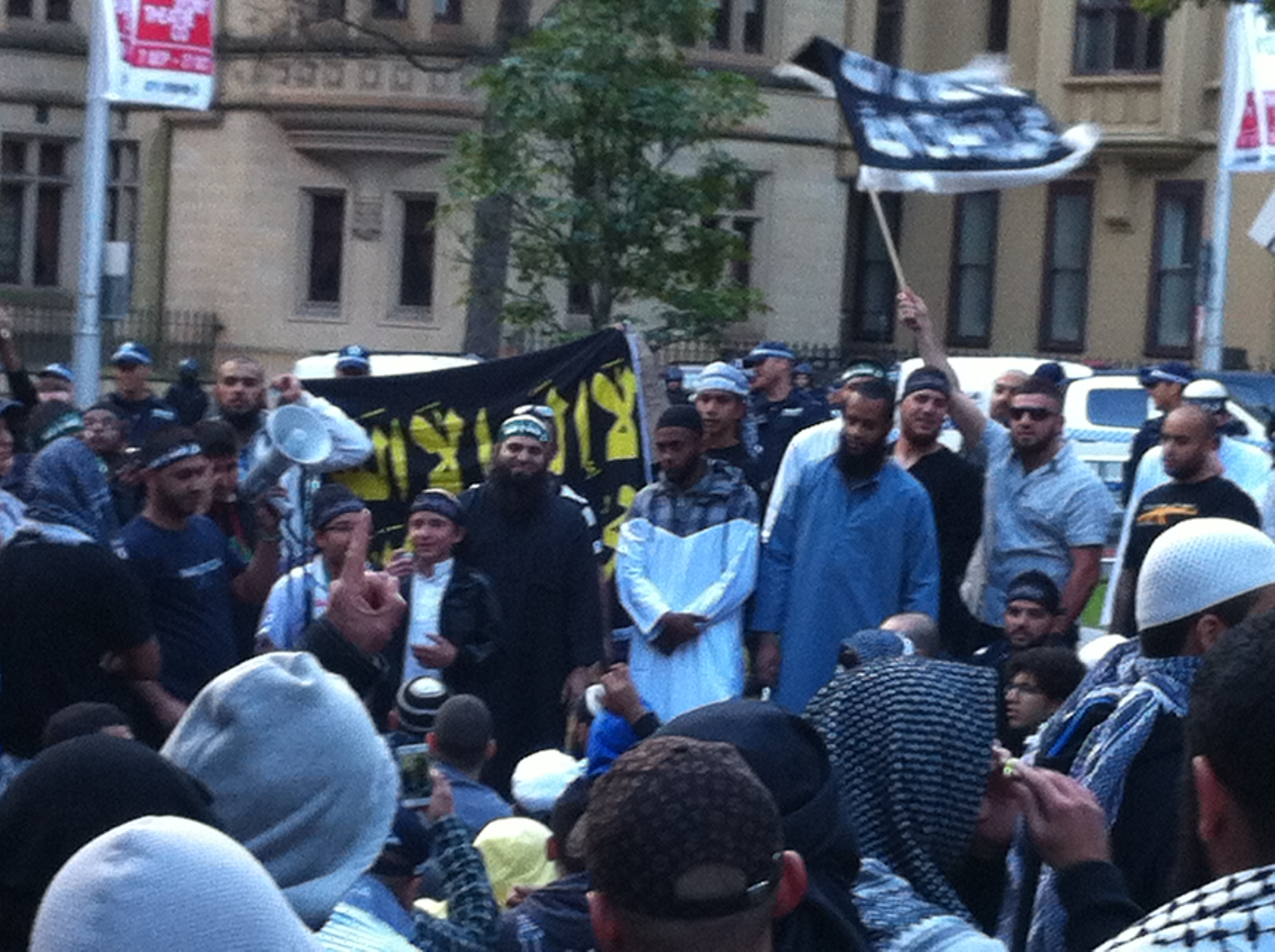
The protest group rallies in Hyde Park.

The Australian Prime Minister, Julia Gillard, condemned the violence saying, "Violent protest is never acceptable – not today, not ever." The Premier of New South Wales, Barry O'Farrell, condemned the violence and promised to hold the perpetrators accountable, and that he was "delighted there has been such a strong statement by Islamic leaders and scholars". The Federal Opposition Leader, Tony Abbott, also condemned the use of violence and called on the perpetrators to be prosecuted.

Leaders of 25 Muslim organisations met on the Monday night and said that the protests over the film were "unacceptable and un-Islamic", and that they did not support even peaceful protest. The Board of Imams Victoria met on 17 September to discuss strategies to prevent riots in Melbourne. The President of the Australian National Imams Council emphasised the importance of correct education of the younger generation. The plan of the Board of Imams Victoria was that the same message of peace should be preached across Australia on Friday 21 September with parents being urged to stay at home with their children after Friday prayers. Sheik Azeim urged all young Muslims in Australia to remember that they are Australians first, and that facilities such as schools, hospitals and the social security organisation Centrelink did not question whether they were Muslim.

== Terrorist links ==
An ABC Four Corners investigation "Plan of Attack" found that some leaders of the protest and prayers were involved in terrorist recruitment for ISIS and local planned terrorist operations. Among those involved with terrorist links were Khaled Sharrouf and Mohamed Elomar.

== See also ==
- Chronology of the reactions to Innocence of Muslims
