= Nakoula Basseley Nakoula =

Egyptian-American filmmaker (born 1957)

- Born: 1957 (age 68–69); Egypt
- Other names: Sam Bacile; Mark Basseley Youssef; Yousseff M. Basseley; Nicola Bacily; Robert Bacily; and several others
- Occupations: Writer, producer, former gas station owner.
- Known for: Writer, producer of the anti-Islamic video Innocence of Muslims

Mark Basseley Youssef (Arabic: مارك باسيلي يوسف, born 1957), formerly known as Nakoula Basseley Nakoula (Arabic: ناكولا باسيلي ناكولا), is an Egyptian-American writer, producer, and promoter of Innocence of Muslims, an anti-Islamic film which disparages the Islamic prophet Muhammad.

On July 2, 2012, a "Sam Bacile", who was later identified as Nakoula, posted English-language promotional trailers for Innocence of Muslims on YouTube. The videos were later dubbed into Arabic and posted on the Internet in September 2012. Demonstrations and violent protests against the video broke out on September 11 in Egypt and spread to other Arab and Muslim countries and some western countries. These protests led to more than 50 deaths and hundreds of injuries.

On September 27, 2012, U.S. federal authorities stated that Nakoula had been arrested in Los Angeles and charged with violating terms of his probation. Prosecutors stated that the violations included making false statements regarding his role in the film and his use of the alias "Sam Bacile".

On November 7, 2012, Nakoula pleaded guilty to four of the charges against him and was sentenced to one year in prison and four years of supervised release.

== Early life and past criminal convictions ==
Nakoula was born in Egypt to Coptic Christian parents and speaks Egyptian Arabic. In a September 2012 interview with Voice of America's Arabic-language station, Radio Sawa, he stated he was a graduate of the Faculty of Arts at Cairo University and a researcher of Islamic thought. At some point, he emigrated to Southern California where he operated gas stations in Hawaiian Gardens, California and resided in Cerritos, in Los Angeles County, California. Nakoula attended a number of Coptic churches in the area, including St. George Coptic Orthodox Church in Bellflower, but was not a regular member.

According to the Associated Press, "Nakoula struggled with a series of financial problems". In 1996, a lien for $194,000 was filed against Nakoula's gas station for unpaid taxes, penalties, and interest dating from 1989 to 1992. A $106,000 lien was filed against him in 1997. He filed for bankruptcy protection in 2000, owing several banks a total of $166,500, but later failing to make payments under the bankruptcy plan. A $191,000 tax lien was filed against him in 2006.

The Daily Beast reported that Nakoula was arrested by the Los Angeles County Sheriff's Department in 1997 after being pulled over and found to be in possession of ephedrine, hydroiodic acid and $45,000 in cash. Nakoula was charged with intent to manufacture methamphetamine. He pleaded guilty and was sentenced in 1997 to one year in Los Angeles County Jail and three years' probation. According to the Los Angeles County District Attorney, he violated probation in 2002 and was re-sentenced to another year in county jail.

In 2010, Nakoula pleaded no contest to federal charges of bank fraud in California. Nakoula had opened bank accounts using fake names and stolen Social Security numbers, including one belonging to a 6-year-old child, and deposited checks from those accounts to withdraw at ATMs. The prosecutor described the scheme as check kiting: "You try to get the money out of the bank before the bank realizes they are drawn from a fraudulent account. There basically is no money." Nakoula's June 2010 sentencing transcript shows that after being arrested, he testified against an alleged ring leader of the fraud scheme, in exchange for a lighter sentence. He was sentenced to 21 months in federal prison, followed by five years' probation (supervised release), and ordered to pay $794,701 in restitution. He was sent to prison, then to a halfway house, and was released from custody in June 2011.

A few weeks after his release, Nakoula began working on Innocence of Muslims. Conditions of Nakoula's probation include not using aliases and not using the Internet without prior approval from his probation officer.

== Innocence of Muslims ==
Nakoula has been identified as a key figure behind Innocence of Muslims, an anti-Islamic video posted on YouTube that disparages Muhammad, and that has been blamed for sparking demonstrations and riots in the Middle East, North Africa, and other regions. After protests against Innocence of Muslims began on 11 September 2012, a man who identified himself as "Sam Bacile", the YouTube poster of the videos, called the Associated Press and The Wall Street Journal. He claimed he had produced a movie titled Innocence of Muslims, which was being promoted on YouTube. He claimed the movie had been funded by $5 million collected from 100 Jewish donors, and that he himself was an Israeli Jew.

By September 13, Nakoula had been linked to the movie and the persona Sam Bacile, by the Associated Press and U.S. federal authorities. The Associated Press reported that the cellphone number that "Bacile" used for an interview matched Nakoula's address, and among Nakoula's 13 previously known aliases were names which were similar to Sam Bacile (his middle name is Basseley). Nakoula denied being Bacile, but federal law enforcement officials identified Nakoula as the key filmmaker. Parts of the video appear to have been recorded at Nakoula's home. According to authorities, Nakoula claimed he wrote the script while in prison. He said he was a producer and that the money for it ($50,000–$60,000) came from his wife's family in Egypt.

=== Arrest and imprisonment ===
Following the violent reactions to the video, Nakoula and his family went into hiding, and the Cerritos home was listed for sale. His attorney has said he has received threats to his safety. On 15 September 2012, federal authorities took Nakoula in for an interview about possible probation violations related to the film's distribution on the Internet.

On September 27, 2012, U.S. federal authorities arrested Nakoula in Los Angeles charging eight counts of probation violation. Prosecutors alleged that some of the violations included making false statements regarding his role in the film and his use of the alias "Sam Bacile". None of the charges relate to his use of the Internet. Following a hearing before a judge, Nakoula was ordered to jail without bail, with the judge citing probation violations including lying to probation officials, "danger to the community", and "lack of trust in the defendant". On 7 November, he pleaded guilty to four of the charges against him in an apparent plea bargain. He was subsequently sentenced to a year in federal prison and four years of supervised release.

On November 28, 2012, an Egyptian court, prior to the ouster of the Muslim Brotherhood-dominated government of Mohamed Morsi, sentenced Nakoula, along with several other Coptic Christians, and anti-Islam preacher Terry Jones, all to death, in absentia, for defaming Islam; all of these individuals, however, live outside Egypt. Pakistani railways minister Ghulam Ahmad Bilour privately offered a $100,000 bounty for the death of Nakoula.

In August 2013, Nakoula was released from prison to serve his remaining sentence in a halfway house, and then to be on probation for the next four years. On 26 September 2013, he was released from the halfway house to the custody of Pastor Wiley Drake of First Southern Baptist Church in Buena Park, California.
