= Investigations into the 2012 Benghazi attack =

Congressional investigations into attacks in Libya

Ten investigations were conducted into the 2012 Benghazi attack, six of these by Republican-controlled House committees. Problems were identified with security measures at the Benghazi facilities, due to poor decisions made by employees of the State Department's Bureau of Diplomatic Security, and specifically its director Eric Boswell, who resigned under pressure in December 2012.

Despite numerous allegations against Obama administration officials of scandal, cover-up and lying regarding the Benghazi attack and its aftermath, none of the ten investigations found any evidence to support those allegations. The last of the investigation committees issued its final report and shut down in December 2016, one month after the 2016 presidential election.

== Federal Bureau of Investigation ==
The FBI opened its investigation soon after the attack and it remains ongoing. On May 2, 2013, the FBI released photos of three men from the Benghazi attack site, asking for help from the public in identifying the individuals. On June 16, 2014, in a joint effort by U.S. Special Operations and the FBI near Benghazi, Libya, an alleged ringleader of the Benghazi attack, Ahmed Abu Khattala, was apprehended. He was removed to a U.S. warship in the Mediterranean and was later to be transported to the United States.

== Senate Select Committee on Intelligence ==
The U.S. Senate Select Committee on Intelligence delivered their bipartisan report on the terrorist attacks on January 15, 2014. The majority of the committee offered the following conclusions:

- The attacks were preventable.
- There were no protests in the area prior to the attack.
- Although the attack did not arise from prior protests, it "did not require significant amounts of preplanning".
- Terrorists who participated in the attacks included members of al-Qa'ida in the Lands of the Islamic Maghreb, Ansar al-Sharia, al-Qaeda in the Arabian Peninsula, and the Mohammad Jamal Network.
- The CIA talking points were flawed but still "painted a mostly accurate picture of the IC's analysis of the Benghazi attacks at that time, in an unclassified form and without compromising the nascent [FBI] investigation of the attacks".
- In general, the majority concluded "that the interagency coordination process on the talking points followed normal, but rushed coordination procedures and that there were no efforts by the White House or any other Executive Branch entities to 'cover-up' facts or make alterations for political purposes".

== Five House committees ==
Five House committees (Armed Services, Foreign Affairs, Intelligence, Judiciary, and Oversight and Government Reform) initiated their own inquiries soon after the attack. The Republicans on these five House committees delivered an interim report to the members of the House Republican Conference on April 23, 2013. The interim report, which contains the conclusions of the Republican majority staff, signed only by the five Republican chairmen of those committees and stated "This staff report has not been officially adopted by the Committee on Armed Services, the Committee on Foreign Affairs, the Committee on the Judiciary, the Committee on Oversight and Government Reform, or the Permanent Select Committee on Intelligence and therefore may not necessarily reflect the views of their Members," was critical of the Obama administration's actions before, during, and after the attack. Among dozens of findings, the report states that:

- "Senior State Department officials knew that the threat environment in Benghazi was high and that the Benghazi compound was vulnerable and unable to withstand an attack, yet the department continued to systematically withdraw security personnel"
- The "[Obama] Administration willfully perpetuated a deliberately misleading and incomplete narrative that the attacks evolved from a political demonstration caused by a YouTube video."
- "... after a White House Deputies Meeting on Saturday, September 15, 2012, the Administration altered the talking points to remove references to the likely participation of Islamic extremists in the attacks. The Administration also removed references to the threat of extremists linked to al-Qa'ida in Benghazi and eastern Libya ..."
- "The Administration deflected responsibility by blaming the [intelligence community] for the information it communicated to the public in both the talking points and the subsequent narrative it perpetuated."

Democrats on the five committees criticized the report, which they said had been written without Democratic input, as a "partisan Republican" work that was "unnecessarily politicizing our national security".

Additional congressional hearings were conducted May 8, 2013, with three "whistleblower" witnesses: Mark Thompson, acting deputy assistant Secretary of State for counterterrorism; Greg Hicks, former deputy chief of mission in Libya; and Eric Nordstrom, former regional security officer in Libya.

On November 7, 2013, Representative Devin Nunes (R-CA) wrote a letter to House Speaker John Boehner a week ahead of congressional hearing with CIA contractors who were on the ground during the attack. Nunes wrote that if questions remain unanswered or "if some answers differ substantially from the established narrative and timeline of the attack, then it would be warranted to take new measures to complete the investigation and synthesize the information obtained by the Intelligence Committees and other committees investigating the Benghazi attack."

On August 1, 2014, the House Intelligence Committee concluded that there was no deliberate wrongdoing by the Obama administration in the 2012 attack on the U.S. Consulate in Benghazi, Libya, and that news briefing given by the administration reflected the conflicting intelligence assessments in the days immediately following the crisis. Representative Dutch Ruppersberger stated, "the intelligence community warned about an increased environment, but did not have specific tactical warning of an attack before it happened." A report, released November 21, 2014, stated that it found no intelligence lapses, that Susan Rice's talking points were "flawed", and was seen as invalidating several theories; the report was criticized by survivors and politicians, including Senator Lindsey Graham.

== State Department Accountability Review Board ==
As required by the Omnibus Diplomatic and Antiterrorism Act of 1986, the State Department established on October 4, 2012, an Accountability Review Board "to examine the facts and circumstances of the attacks". Four members were selected by Clinton, and another was selected by Director of National Intelligence James R. Clapper. Ambassador Thomas R. Pickering served as the chairman, and Admiral Michael Mullen served as the vice chairman. Also serving were Catherine Bertini, Richard Shinnick, and Hugh Turner, who represented the intelligence community.

The investigation report was released December 20, 2012. It was seen as a sharp criticism of State Department officials in Washington for ignoring requests for more guards and safety upgrades, and for failing to adapt security procedures to a deteriorating security environment. "Systemic failures and leadership and management deficiencies at senior levels within two bureaus of the State Department ... resulted in a special mission security posture that was inadequate for Benghazi and grossly inadequate to deal with the attack that took place," said the unclassified version of the report. It also blamed too much reliance on local militias who failed to fend off the attackers that evening. The Council on Foreign Relations in an initial report saw it as a refutation to the notion that the Obama administration delayed its response. The report confirmed that, contrary to initial accounts, there was no protest outside the consulate. It placed responsibility for the incident solely upon the attackers, deemed as terrorists.

== Senate Committee on Homeland Security and Governmental Affairs ==
Homeland Security and Governmental Affairs Committee Chairman Joe Lieberman (I-CT) and Ranking Member Susan Collins (R-ME) opened an investigation in mid October 2012. Their final report was delivered December 31, 2012. According to the report, "there was a high risk of a 'significant' terrorist attack on U.S. employees and facilities in Benghazi in the months before the September 11, 2012, assault on the Mission, and the State Department failed to take adequate steps to reduce the Mission's vulnerability."

== House Select Committee ==
In May 2014, House Speaker John Boehner announced a House select committee would be formed to further investigate the attacks in light of State Department documents released on April 29, 2014, to Judicial Watch, a conservative government watchdog group. These documents, including a cache of previously unreleased emails "that House panels had been unable to receive even after issuing a subpoena," were obtained by Judicial Watch under the Freedom of Information Act (FOIA): one document in particular, an email written by a White House adviser, has been labeled by conservatives as a "smoking gun". The House voted May 8, 2014, to establish the United States House Select Committee on Events Surrounding the 2012 Terrorist Attack in Benghazi, voting 232-186 — 225 Republicans and 7 Democrats in favor, 186 Democrats voting against. The Democratic National Committee sent out a statement describing the committee as a "ploy" and "political stunt".

In a September 29, 2015, Fox TV interview with Sean Hannity, Kevin McCarthy, then in the running for Speaker of the House, said, "Everybody thought Hillary Clinton was unbeatable, right? But we put together a Benghazi special committee, a select committee. What are her numbers today? Her numbers are dropping. Why? Because she's untrustable. But no one would have known any of that had happened, had we not fought." Many media outlets and Democratic lawmakers interpreted this comment as an admission that the investigation was a partisan political undertaking rather than a substantive inquiry. McCarthy later said his comments should have been phrased more clearly and denied the investigation was overtly political.

On October 22, 2015, Clinton testified before the committee and answered members' questions for more than eight hours before the Committee in a public hearing. The New York Times reported, "the long day of often-testy exchanges between committee members and their prominent witness revealed little new information about an episode that has been the subject of seven previous investigations."

== Investigative reporting and opinion commentary ==
Armed forces attacked the U.S. consulate during a protest against an anti-Islamist film. Numerous eyewitnesses reported that the attackers said they were reacting to the film Innocence of Muslims. A Reuters reporter, Hadeel Al-Shalchi, after speaking with authorities, stated: "There was definitely a protest planned around the consulate to mimic what happened in Egypt. Security even told me that, you know, people who were sympathetic with the cause from the security may have even allowed, you know, people to riot very close to the consulate." David D. Kirkpatrick and Suliman Ali Zway of The New York Times reported that there was no peaceful demonstration according to witnesses. A militant organization known as Ansar al-Shariah told people on the scene that they were upset over the video.

On May 3, 2013, Stephen Hayes wrote in The Weekly Standard, "senior Obama administration officials knowingly misled the country about what had happened in the days following the assaults." Hayes said that there was a flurry of revisions made to the talking points in the days before Susan Rice, U.S. ambassador to the United Nations, appeared on five Sunday television talk shows. Included in the cuts were references to "Islamic extremists", reminders of warnings about al Qaeda in Libya, a reference to "jihadists" in Cairo, the mention of possible surveillance of the facility in Benghazi, and the report of five previous attacks on foreign interests.

On May 10, 2013, ABC News' Jonathan Karl reported that Stephen Hayes had "obtained 12 different versions of the talking points that show they were extensively edited as they evolved from the drafts first written entirely by the CIA to the final version distributed to Congress and to U.S. Ambassador to the U.N. Susan Rice before she appeared on five talk shows". The changes made to the talking points, according to the report, appear to directly contradict what White House Press Secretary Jay Carney said about them in November 2012. Afterwards, Carney stated the reports did not contradict what he said and that it was the CIA's task to review the talking points. The White House then released copies of various emails that were sent to various administration officials shortly after the attack took place to prove that there was no cover up. On the May 12 episode of ABC News' This Week, Karl said that when then-CIA Director David Petraeus saw the final talking points the Saturday before Rice went on the Sunday talk shows he said they were "essentially useless". Karl went on to quote from an e-mail in which Petraeus said of the talking points: "I would just as soon not use them, but it's their [the White House's] call."

Research by other media outlets later proved that Karl's report was inaccurate, as his sources had twisted what was written in the documents. On the May 19 episode of ABC News' This Week, Karl announced he regretted reporting the inaccuracy and acknowledged that he exaggerated the words Obama speechwriter Ben Rhodes had written in one of emails cited in the documents. Memos written by State Department spokeswoman Victoria Nuland also revealed that she made the revisions because they "could be abused by members [of Congress] to beat up the State Department for not paying attention to warnings". On July 11, Nuland, who was nominated by Obama to be the top US envoy to Europe, told various members of the Senate Foreign Relations Committee during a confirmation hearing that she had made the revisions and that she had feared Republicans in Congress would politicize the original memos and present a false impression that various top US State Department officials, including then-Secretary of State Hillary Clinton, had covered-up information about the attack.

In August 2013, it was reported by Drew Griffin and Kathleen Johnston of CNN that dozens of CIA operatives were on the ground in Benghazi on the night of the attack. Their sources say 35 people were on the ground in Benghazi the night of attack, and 21 of those worked in the annex building. They further reported that according to their sources the agency was going to great lengths to keep what they were doing a secret, including polygraphing some of the survivors monthly in order to find out if they were talking to the media or Congress. The actions of the CIA were described as pure intimidation, with any leak risking the loss of a career. Former CIA agent Robert Baer described the frequency of the polygraphs as rare.

A six-part report on an investigation by The New York Times on the attack was published on the Times website on December 28, 2013. Based on "months of investigation" and "extensive interviews with Libyans in Benghazi who had direct knowledge of the attack there and its context", the investigation found "no evidence that Al Qaeda or other international terrorist groups" had any role in the assault, but that the attackers included militias that "benefited directly from NATO's extensive air power and logistics support" overthrowing Colonel Qaddafi, and whom the Americans "had taken for allies". It found that the US compound "had been under surveillance at least 12 hours before the assault started", but that the attack also had "spontaneous elements".

Anger at the video [Innocence of Muslims] motivated the initial attack. Dozens of people joined in, some of them provoked by the video and others responding to fast-spreading false rumors that guards inside the American compound had shot Libyan protesters. Looters and arsonists, without any sign of a plan, were the ones who ravaged the compound after the initial attack, according to more than a dozen Libyan witnesses as well as many American officials who have viewed the footage from security cameras.

In the following weeks, several U.S. lawmakers (both Democrats and Republicans), publicly stated, "the intelligence indicates that al Qaeda was involved."

In April 2014, Seymour Hersh published an essay in the London Review of Books in which he explores an anonymous former Pentagon official's claims that the U.S. diplomatic post in Benghazi "had no real political role" and existed solely to provide cover for a secret arms pipeline supporting Syrian rebels fighting in the Syrian civil war. According to Hersh's source, the "rat line" was a means for channeling military weapons, including surface-to-air missile launchers (MANPADS), from Gaddafi's arsenals into Syria and into the hands of Syrian rebels. The operation was reportedly funded by Turkey, Saudi Arabia and Qatar, and was conducted by the CIA in collaboration with MI6. Hersh's accounts of covert involvement by the U.S. and allies in the Syrian Civil War have been denied by U.S. and Turkish officials. In January 2014, the United States House Permanent Select Committee on Intelligence had cast doubt on this alleged United States involvement and reported that "All CIA activities in Benghazi were legal and authorized. On-the-record testimony establishes that CIA was not sending weapons (including MANPADS) from Libya to Syria, or facilitating other organizations or states that were transferring weapons from Libya to Syria."

On October 22, 2015, it was revealed that Clinton had e-mailed her daughter Chelsea at 11:12 p.m. on September 11 that the officers had been killed by an 'Al-Queda like group.'

== See also ==
- Timeline of the investigation into the 2012 Benghazi attack
