= Sheikh Khalad Abdalla =

Egyptian television news host

- Born: 1 January 1964 (age 62)
- Occupations: Television presenter, Writer, Journalist

Sheikh Khalad Abdalla (Arabic: خالد عبد الله يونس; born 1964) is a former Egyptian television news host on the Islamic satellite channel Al-Nas TV (Arabic قناة الناس ) until the shutdown of Al-Nas TV on July 3, 2013. On his September 8, 2012, show he played a clip from Innocence of Muslims, a few days prior to the 2012 diplomatic missions attacks Al Jazeera English called him controversial and hardline.
