= Terry Jones (pastor) =

American anti-Islamic activist (born 1951)

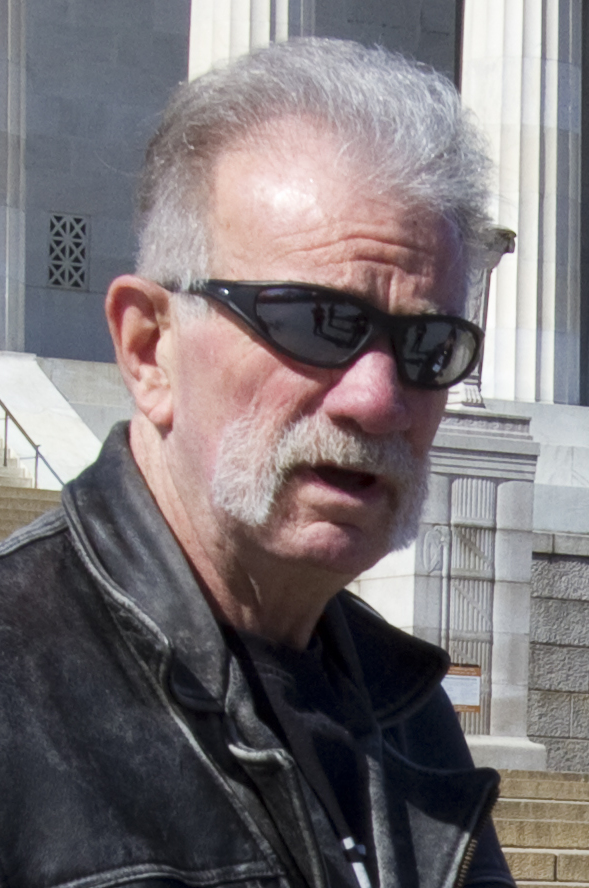
- Jones in 2011
- Title: Pastor

Personal life
- Born: October 1951 (age 75) Cape Girardeau, Missouri, United States
- Home town: Cape Girardeau, Missouri
- Spouse: Sylvia Jones (m. 2001)
- Political party: Independent
- Education: Central High School, Cape Girardeau, Missouri, Southeast Missouri State University
- Known for: Qur'an burning
- Occupation: Pastor

Religious life
- Religion: Nondenominational Christianity
- Church: Dove World Outreach Center

Senior posting
- Based in: Gainesville, Florida, United States
- Period in office: 1981–present
- Awards: Honorary degree from California Graduate School of Theology

Terry Jones (born October 1951) is an American anti-Islamic right-wing activist, who was the pastor of Dove World Outreach Center, a small nondenominational Christian church located, until July 2013, in Gainesville, Florida. He is the president of a political group, Stand Up America Now. He first gained national and international attention in 2010 for his plan to burn Qur'ans, the scripture of the Islamic religion, on the ninth anniversary of the September 11 attacks and for burning the Qur'an afterward.

Jones was an independent candidate in the 2012 and 2016 United States presidential elections.

== Early life and education ==
Jones, a native of Cape Girardeau, Missouri, graduated from Cape Girardeau's Central High School in 1969. He then attended Southeast Missouri State University for two years. Jones received no academic degree in theology but was given an honorary degree from the unaccredited California Graduate School of Theology in 1983, which sought to disassociate itself from him during the 2010 Qur'an burning controversy.

== Career ==
Jones worked as an assistant hotel manager in the late 1970s, then became an assistant pastor with Maranatha Campus Ministries in Kentucky. He went to Cologne, Germany with his first wife to work as a missionary and founded and led the Christliche Gemeinde Köln (CGK) in 1981, with that church growing to as many as 1,000 members over the years, initially as a branch of the Maranatha Campus Ministries and a sister church to Dove World Outreach Center of Gainesville, Florida.

On September 18, 1997, Jones spoke during the First Session of the 105th Congress at a hearing before the Commission on Security and Cooperation in Europe in Washington, D.C., concerning the religious persecution of Christians in Europe.

While living in Germany, Jones was fined $3,800 by a Cologne court for using the "doctor" title awarded with an honorary degree from an unaccredited school.

According to the German Evangelical Alliance, Jones was released from the leadership of the Christliche Gemeinde Köln in 2008 due to his indefensible theological statements and his craving for attention. The Gainesville Sun reported that he left the church in Germany after being accused of fraud. A leader of the Cologne church said that Jones "didn't project the biblical values and Christianity, but always made himself the center of everything." German press agency Deutsche Presse-Agentur reported that church members said Jones ran the Cologne church like a sect leader and used psychological pressure on members, "subordinating all activities to his will." Der Spiegel reported that Jones had been ejected by Cologne church for creating "a climate of control and fear." Following Jones' departure, the CGK closed, then reopened under new, independent, leadership.

Jones came to lead the Dove World Outreach Center in Gainesville, Florida church by way of his association with the Maranatha Campus Ministries.

In October 2010, Jones founded the political organization, Stand Up America Now.

On October 27, 2011, Jones announced that he was running for President of the United States, as an independent candidate, with no political party affiliation. His platform called for the deportation of all illegal immigrants, withdrawal of American troops abroad, and a reduction in bureaucracy and corporate tax rates.

In March 2013, Florida media sources reported that Jones, with Dove World Outreach Center, and the organization Stand Up America Now planned to leave Gainesville, Florida and move to Tampa, Florida. In August 2013, The Bradenton Herald reported that Jones had purchased property near Bradenton and planned to move his ministry there.

Jones relocated to Bradenton, Florida, breaking with most of his 15-member flock at Dove Outreach, but retaining his associate pastor Wayne Sapp. In 2015, Jones opened a Fry Guys Gourmet Fries stand at a mall in Bradenton, selling Buffalo wings and speaking his mind until later in the week when a mall manager, concerned about potential trouble, requested him to stay out of the mall, remove photos of himself from the premises and take his name off the lease, though he remained an owner of the company. He also owned a furniture moving company, TSC, with his brother. TSC deliveries became backlogged and received consumer complaints shortly after the January 15 Charlie Hebdo attack in 2015 raised concerns about al Qaida and later in 2015, TSC went out of business.

In 2017, Jones was reported to have worked as a driver for Uber's ride-hailing service. He was removed by the company after a report that accused him of sharing anti-Islamic messages with passengers.

== Personal life ==
His first wife, Lisa Jones, died in 1996, after which he married Sylvia Jones, with whom he runs TS and Company. His daughter from his first marriage, Emma, has distanced herself from his beliefs and practices.

== Protests ==
=== "Islam Is of the Devil" ===
Terry Jones authored a book titled Islam Is of the Devil. In July 2009, Dove World Outreach Center posted a sign on its lawn which stated in large red letters "Islam is of the Devil," resulting in objections from the community and media attention. Students from the church attended area schools in August 2009 wearing T-shirts with "Islam is of the Devil" printed on the back, for which they were sent home.

=== Qur'an burnings ===
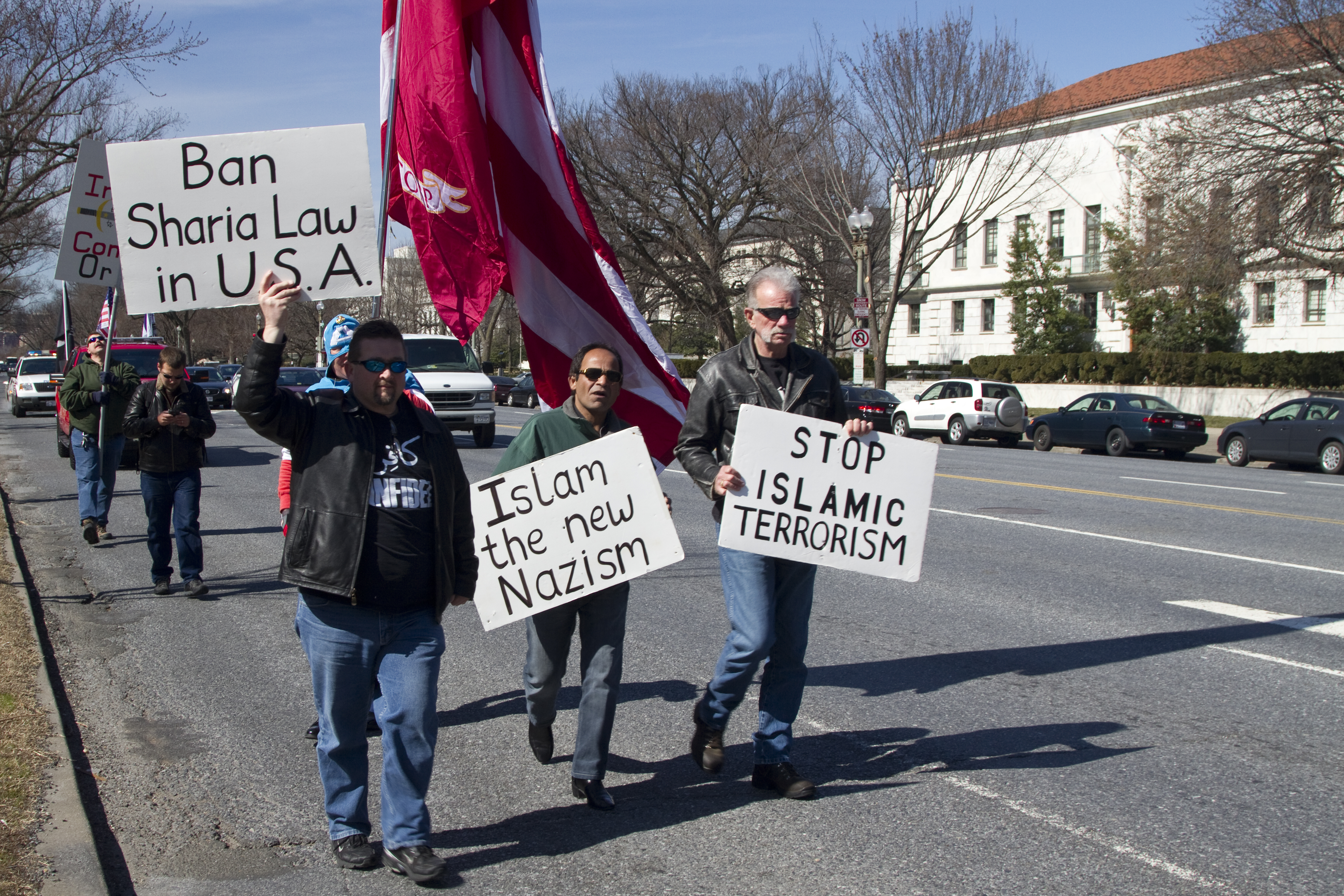
Jones and his followers at a march in Washington DC.

Jones believes Islam promotes violence and that Muslims want to impose sharia law in the United States. He did not become widely known until after announcing plans to burn copies of the Qur'an.

The plan to burn Qur'ans was first announced on Twitter on July 12, 2010, and was promoted on Facebook and on YouTube. National and International discussion, objections and protests contributed to extensive media coverage.

U.S. Secretary of State Hillary Clinton said, "It's regrettable that a pastor in Gainesville, Florida with a church of no more than fifty people can make this outrageous and distressful, disgraceful plan and get, you know, the world's attention."

The commander of the International Security Assistance Force in Afghanistan, General David Petraeus said, "It is precisely the kind of action the Taliban uses and could cause significant problems. Not just here, but everywhere in the world we are engaged with the Islamic community." The pastor responded to Petraeus' statement that, "We understand the General's concerns. We are sure that his concerns are legitimate. [Nonetheless] [w]e must send a clear message to the radical element of Islam. We will no longer be controlled and dominated by their fears and threats."

President Barack Obama was asked on September 9, 2010, on ABC's Good Morning America about the Qur'an burning controversy. He said, "You could have serious violence in places like Pakistan or Afghanistan. This could increase the recruitment of individuals who would be willing to blow themselves up in American cities or European cities." He said, "I just want him to understand that this stunt that he is talking about pulling could greatly endanger our young men and women in uniform who are in Iraq, who are in Afghanistan. We're already seeing protests against Americans just by the mere threat that he's making." "I just hope he understands that what he is proposing to do is completely contrary to our values as Americans, that this country has been built on the notions of religious freedom and religious tolerance," Obama said. "He says he's someone who is motivated by his faith ... I hope he listens to those better angels and understands that this is a destructive act that he's engaging in." Asked if the event could be stopped, Obama replied, "My understanding is that he can be cited for public burning … but that's the extent of the laws that we have available to us."

US Secretary of Defense Robert Gates called Jones asking him not to go through with his Qur'an burning.

Later on September 9, Jones announced the cancellation of the event and a plan to fly to New York to meet with the Imam of Park51, Feisal Abdul Rauf. Jones alleged that Imam Muhammad Musri, the president of the Islamic Society of Central Florida, had arranged the meeting and that a promise had been given him to move the Park 51 mosque in exchange for the event cancellation. This claim was denied by both Imams.

On March 21, 2011, Jones and some supporters held a mock trial of the Qur'an and set a copy on fire as a "punishment" for "crimes against humanity." Jones was assisted by Ahmed Abaza, an Egyptian ex-Muslim, and a Texas Imam, Mohamed El Hassan who argued for and against the accusations. Reaction to the event resulted in riots and deaths in Afghanistan.

On April 28, 2012, Jones burned a copy of the Qur'an, protesting the imprisonment of an Iranian-American pastor, Saeed Abedini in Iran.

An arrest defeated Jones' effort to hold a Qur'an-burning protest on September 11, 2013, but Jones and Sapp held a protest on September 11, 2014, in which the ISIS flag and hundreds of Qur'ans were burned.

=== Dearborn, Michigan ===
On April 29, Jones led a rally at the Dearborn City Hall, designated as a free speech zone. Riot police were called out to control counter protesters.

Jones led a rally at City Hall and then planned to speak at the annual Arab Festival on June 18, 2011, but on his way there he was blocked by protesters, six of whom were arrested. Police said they did not have enough officers present to maintain safety.

On April 7, 2012, Jones led a protest in front of the Islamic Center of America in Dearborn, speaking about Islam and free speech. The mosque was placed on lock down. Thirty police cars were there to block traffic and prevent a counter protest.

Jones returned to Dearborn in October 2012 and led a small protest against alleged "Muslim bullying of non-Muslims" outside Edsel Ford High School. School officials denied there was a problem.

=== Obama effigy ===
In 2012, Jones hanged an effigy of Barack Obama in the front yard of the Dove World Outreach Center. Another effigy of Barack Obama was burned along with an effigy of Bill Clinton in January 2013.

=== Innocence of Muslims film ===
In September 2012, Terry Jones was involved in the promotion of a movie vilifying Islam, titled Innocence of Muslims. The movie led to protests in Egypt, Yemen, Tunisia and Libya. In Cairo, protesters breached the wall of the U.S. Embassy and burned the flag. The U.S. consulate in Benghazi, Libya, was largely burnt and looted, and resulted in the death of the U.S. Ambassador; J. Christopher Stevens and three other American citizens. Jones screened the film for his followers on September 11, 2012, a day he dubbed, "International Judge Mohammad Day".

Later the same year, he partnered with Pakistani filmmaker Imran Firasat in promoting his Islam-critical documentary The Innocent Prophet.

== Legal issues ==
=== United Kingdom ===
Jones was invited to an English Defence League rally in Luton in February 2011 to share his views on Islamic extremism. Anti-fascist group Hope not Hate successfully petitioned the Home Secretary to have Jones banned from entering the UK.

=== Gainesville, Florida ===
Following the April 28, 2012 Qur'an burning, Jones was fined $271 by Gainesville Fire Rescue for violating fire safety rules.

=== Dearborn, Michigan ===
Jones planned to protest in April 2011 outside the Islamic Center of America. On the day he was to attend the protest, local authorities questioned him in Court, required him either to post a $45,000 "peace bond" to cover Dearborn's cost if Jones was attacked by extremists or to go to trial. Jones contested that requirement, and the jury voted on April 22 to require the posting of a $1 "peace bond", but Jones and his co-pastor Wayne Sapp continued to refuse to pay. They were held briefly in jail, while claiming violation of First Amendment rights. That night Jones was released by the court. The ACLU had filed an amicus brief in support of Jones's protest plans.

On November 11, 2011, Wayne County Circuit Court Judge Robert Ziolkowski vacated the "breach of peace" ruling against Jones and Wayne Sapp on the grounds that they were denied due process.

Terry Jones and his organization Stand Up America Now won a victory in court on August 30, 2013 over the City of Dearborn and its Chief of Police, Ronald Haddad. Terry Jones was represented by the Thomas More Law Center. Judge Denise Page Hood wrote, "The Court finds that Plaintiffs are entitled to summary judgment as to their claim that Ord. No. 17-33, requiring Plaintiffs to sign an indemnification agreement, is a violation of their First Amendment rights of Freedom of Speech and Freedom of Expressive Association. The related ordinance, Ord. No. 17-28(d), requiring the chief of police to grant a special events permit only after an indemnification agreement is signed, also violates Plaintiffs' First Amendment rights." Judge Hood concluded that both ordinances were unconstitutional.

=== Canada ===
On October 11, 2012, Jones was denied entry to Canada, where he was scheduled to attend a debate on free speech, because of a previous legal infraction in Dearborn, Michigan, and because the German government had fined him 20 years before for using the title of "Doctor". The Dearborn charge was challenged and overturned in November 2011, and Jones had held an honorary doctorate, but the Canadian government refused to allow him entry without documentation of the cases, effectively barring him from the event.

=== Polk County, Florida ===
In April 2013, Jones announced plans for a Qur'an burning event to be held on September 11, 2013. In Iran, Pakistan, and at an Interfaith Conference in Vienna there have been calls for the United States government to stop this event. Army General Lloyd Austin III, commander of US Central Command called Jones on September 9, 2013, to ask him cancel the event, however Jones declined. Police arrested Jones on September 11, 2013, before he could burn 2,998 Qur'ans soaked with kerosene at a park in Polk County, Florida. He was charged with unlawfully conveying fuel and openly carrying a firearm. The charge of unlawfully conveying fuel, made against both Jones and Marvin Wayne Sapp, who was driving, was dismissed in October, 2014 by Circuit Court judge Roger Alcott, who wrote "For purposes of the legal analysis, the nature of the books in the grill does not matter... It would not matter if the materials in the grill were books, oak wood or BBQ briquettes. The material facts simply do not demonstrate a violation of Florida statutes." This dismissal was upheld by the Second District Court of Appeals in June, 2015.

=== Egypt ===
On November 28, 2012, following the release of the controversial film Innocence of Muslims, an Egyptian court sentenced the film’s creator Nakoula Basseley Nakoula as well as Jones and several others to death in absentia for “defaming” Islam.

=== Denmark ===
In May 2017 he was banned from entering Denmark according to an announcement by Inger Støjberg, then Danish Minister for Immigration, Integration and Housing.

== Death threats ==
Since July 2009, Jones and his church have received hundreds of death threats by phone and mail, while some have been published on websites overseas.

In March 2011, the Pakistani radical Islamist group Jama'at-ud-Da'wah issued a US$2.2 million reward and fatwa calling for Jones' death.

After the 2012 Qur'an burning protest, an Iranian cleric called for Jones to be executed.

Al Qaeda in the Arabian Peninsula featured Jones on a 'Wanted Dead' poster in its tenth edition of Inspire in March 2013.
