= Innocence of Muslims =

2012 short-film by Nakoula Basseley Nakoula

- Directed by: Sam Bacile
- Produced by: Sam Bacile
- Starring: Anna Gurji; Cindy Lee Garcia
- Release dates: June 23, 2012 (Vine Theater); July 2, 2012 (YouTube)
- Running time: 14 minutes
- Country: United States
- Language: English
- Budget: $50,000 - $60,000

Innocence of Muslims is a 2012 anti-Islamic short film written and directed by Nakoula Basseley Nakoula under the pseudonym Sam Bacile. Two versions of the 14-minute video were uploaded to YouTube in July 2012, under the titles "The Real Life of Muhammad" and "Muhammad Movie Trailer". Videos dubbed in Arabic were uploaded during early September 2012. Anti-Islamic content had been added in post-production by dubbing, without the actors' knowledge.

Parts of the video perceived as denigration of the Islamic prophet Muhammad resulted in demonstrations and violent protests against the video to break out on September 11 in Egypt and spread to other Arab and Muslim nations as well as to some western countries. The protests led to hundreds of injuries and over 50 deaths. Fatwas calling for the harm of the video's participants were issued and Pakistani government minister Ghulam Ahmad Bilour offered a bounty for the killing of Nakoula, the producer. The film has sparked debates about freedom of speech and Internet censorship.

== Plot and description ==
The video titled "The Real Life of Muhammad", uploaded on July 1, 2012, has a running time of 13:03 in 480p format. The video "Muhammad Movie Trailer" was uploaded on July 2, 2012, with a running time of 13:51 in 1080p format. They are similar in content.

The trailer opens with a scene portraying the increasing religious minorities persecution and poor human rights in Egypt around the time of the film's production, with increases in church burnings, religious intolerance and sectarian violence against the 10% population of Egypt that are Christian during the time of chaos and revolutions, as well as complaints that authorities have failed to protect religious minorities. The New York Times stated: "The trailer opens with scenes of Egyptian security forces standing idle as Muslims pillage and burn the homes of Egyptian Christians. Then it cuts to cartoonish scenes depicting the Prophet Muhammad as a child of uncertain parentage, a buffoon, a womanizer, a homosexual, a child molester, and a greedy, bloodthirsty thug."

Most references to Islam were overdubbed over the original spoken lines after filming had been completed. The film's 80 cast and crew members have disavowed the film: "The entire cast and crew are extremely upset and feel taken advantage of by the producer. ... We are deeply saddened by the tragedies that have occurred."

The script was originally about life in Egypt 2,000 years ago and was titled Desert Warrior. It was a story about a character called "Master George". Several actors were brought in to overdub lines. They were directed to say specific words, such as "Muhammad". The trailer opens in a medical office, where a presumably Muslim police officer is bragging to Copts, including a doctor, about Muhammad's polygamous romantic life, and implying that Muhammad's marital and sexual practices are a model for all Muslim men. The Copts remain unimpressed, and one of them replies with sarcasm, thus irritating the police officer. The scene then cuts to anti-Coptic mob attacks taking place outside the clinic. As an Islamic call to prayer is sung from somewhere in the area, Muslims are shown committing arson and looting a business which appears to be the clinic, as police do nothing. A young woman wearing a cross is apparently murdered by the rioters. In the final shot of this segment, the police officer who had earlier been arguing in the clinic is seen standing passively in the street, holding some unidentified items presumably looted from the targeted businesses.

In the next scene, the doctor and his family, hiding from the anti-Coptic attacks, take shelter in their home, where the doctor informs two women, implied to be his wife and daughter, that the "angry mob in the city" is the "Islamic Egyptian Police". Presumably after the attack is over, he mentions that they had arrested 1,400 Christians, tortured them, and forced them to confess to "the killings". His daughter asks why they are doing this, to which her father responds "to protect Islamic crimes". The doctor then implies that a crackdown on the violence would save lives and taxpayers' money.

Following this exchange, the doctor takes up a marker and begins writing on a whiteboard: "Man + X = BT". "BT" is overdubbed as "Islamic terrorist". His daughter asks what "X" is. He tells her that she needs to discover that for herself. It is implied X is Muhammad, though the issue is never raised again.

The video continues with scenes set in pre-Islamic and early-Islamic Arabia. It starts with Muhammad supposedly being born 4 years after his father died. Some scenes depict the main character referred to in overdubbing as "Muhammad". In one scene, the "Muhammad" character's wife, "Khadija", suggests mixing parts of the Torah and the New Testament to create the Quran. In another scene, Muhammad is seen speaking to the donkey known as Yaʽfūr in Islamic tradition. It goes on to say that Muhammad was a rapist, pedophile, homosexual, and supported religious persecution, and that these actions were written into the Quran and contributed to the buildup of Islamist terrorist attacks.

=== Reviews ===
A Vanity Fair article described the video as "Exceptionally amateurish, with disjointed dialogue, jumpy editing, and performances that would have looked melodramatic even in a silent movie, the clip is clearly designed to offend Muslims, portraying Mohammed as a bloodthirsty murderer, Lothario and pedophile with omnidirectional sexual appetites."

Reuters said "it portrays Mohammad as a fool, a philanderer and a religious fake and in one clip posted on YouTube, he was shown in an apparent sexual act with a woman. For many Muslims it is blasphemous even to show a depiction of the Prophet."

== Filmmaker and promoters ==
The movie was written and produced by Nakoula Basseley Nakoula, using the pseudonym of "Sam Bacile". Nakoula claimed that he was creating an epic, two-hour film but no such film has come to light.

The project was promoted by Morris Sadek by email and on the blog of the National American Coptic Assembly.

According to a consultant on the project, the videos are "trailers" from a full-length film that was shown only once, to an audience of fewer than ten people, at a rented theater in Hollywood, California. Posters advertising the film used the title Innocence of Bin Laden. The film's original working title was Desert Warrior, and it told the story of "tribal battles prompted by the arrival of a comet on Earth". On September 27, 2012, U.S. federal authorities stated Nakoula was arrested in Los Angeles for allegedly violating terms of his probation. Prosecutors stated that some of the violations included making false statements regarding his role in the film and his use of the alias "Sam Bacile". On November 7, 2012, Nakoula pleaded guilty to four of the charges against him and was sentenced to one year in prison and four years of supervised release.

== Production ==
In July 2011, Nakoula started casting actors for Desert Warrior, the working title at that time. The independent film was directed by a person first identified in casting calls as Alan Roberts, whose original cut and filmed dialog and script did not include references to Muhammad or Islam. According to the casting.backstage.com announcement, it was to be "an HD 24P historical Arabian Desert adventure film" with "Sam Bassiel" as producer with shooting to start in August 2011. The lead was to be "George: male, 20–40, a strong leader, romantic, tyrant, a killer with no remorse, accent".

American non-profit Media for Christ obtained film permits to shoot the movie in August 2011, and Nakoula provided his home as a set and paid the actors, according to government officials and those involved in the production. Joseph Nassralla Abdelmasih, president of Media for Christ, claimed that the company's name was used without his knowledge. He also stated that the film was edited afterwards without Media's involvement. Steve Klein, an anti-Muslim and self-styled counter-jihad activist was hired as a consultant, and was relied on to sharpen the film's Islamophobic framing. Nasralla has however also been noted to have had close ties both to Klein and to the counter-jihad movement. Klein later appeared publicly claiming to be the spokesman for the film. Klein told journalist Jeffrey Goldberg that despite previous claims, "Bacile" is not a real person and is neither Israeli nor Jewish and that the name is a pseudonym. Israeli authorities found no sign of his being an Israeli citizen, and there was no indication of a "Sam Bacile" living in California or participating in Hollywood filmmaking.

By September 13, 2012, "Sam Bacile" was identified as Nakoula Basseley Nakoula, a 55-year-old Coptic Christian from Egypt living near Los Angeles, California, with known aliases. In the 1990s, he served time in prison for the intent to manufacture methamphetamine. He pleaded no contest in 2010 to bank fraud charges, was sentenced to 21 months in prison, and was released on probation in June 2011. Nakoula claims to have written the script while in prison and raised between $50,000 and $60,000 from his wife's family in Egypt to finance the film. The FBI contacted him due to the potential for threats, but said he was not under investigation. On September 27, 2012, U.S. federal authorities arrested Nakoula in Los Angeles for suspicion of violating terms of his probation. Violations included making false statements regarding his role in the film and his use of the alias "Sam Bacile". On November 7, 2012, Nakoula pleaded guilty to four of the charges against him and was sentenced to one year in prison and four years of supervised release.

Law professor Stephen L. Carter and constitutional law expert Floyd Abrams have each stated that the government cannot prosecute the film's producer for its content because of the First Amendment to the U.S. Constitution, which protects freedom of speech in the United States.

== Screening and Internet upload ==
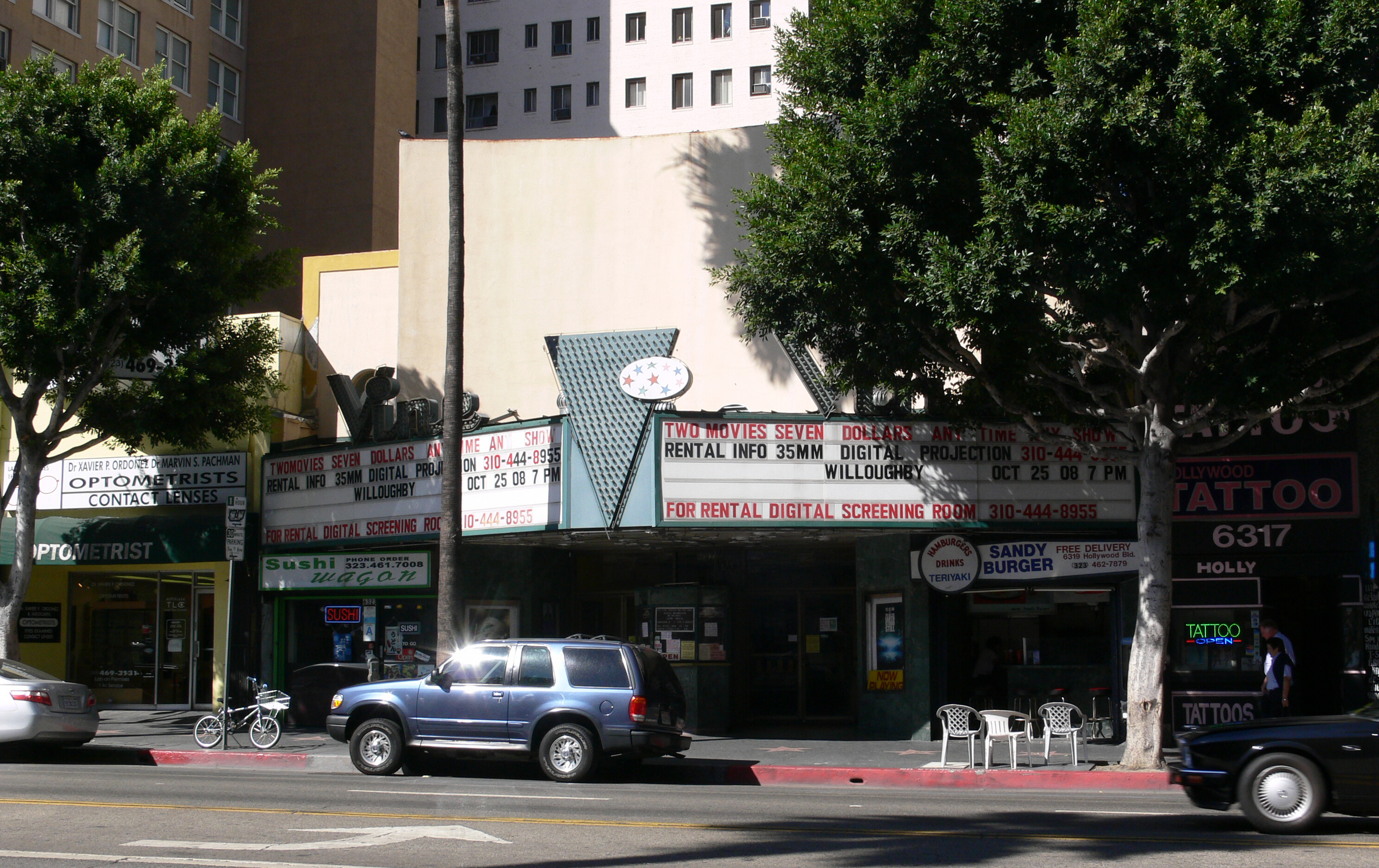
Vine Theater, Hollywood, California, where the single screening took place

The video production "Innocence of Bin Laden" was advertised in the Anaheim-based newspaper Arab World during May and June 2012. The advertisement cost $300 to run three times in the paper and was paid by an individual identified only as "Joseph". The advertisements were noted by the Anti-Defamation League (ADL), whose Islamic affairs director stated, "When we saw the advertisement in the paper, we were interested in knowing if it was some kind of pro-jihadist movie." Brian Donnelly, a guide for a Los Angeles based tour of famous crime scenes who noticed the poster advertising at the Vine Theater, said, "I didn't know if it was a good thing or a bad thing. We didn't know what it was about because we can't read Arabic." The earlier version of the film was screened once at the Vine Theater of June 23, 2012 to an audience of only ten people. The film had no subtitles and was presented in English. An employee of the theater stated, "The film we screened was titled The Innocence of Bin Laden", and added that it was a "small viewing".

A second screening was planned for June 30, 2012. A local Hollywood blogger, John Walsh, attended a June 29 Los Angeles City Council meeting, where he raised his concerns about the title of a film to be screened that appeared to support the leader of al-Qaeda. He said "There is an alarming event occurring in Hollywood on Saturday. A group has rented the Vine Street theater to show a video entitled Innocence of Bin Laden. We have no idea what this group is." The blog site reported that the June 30 screening had been canceled. A Current TV producer photographed the poster while it was being displayed at the theater as advertising to later discuss on the talk show The Young Turks. The poster did not denigrate Muslims, but rather referred to "my Muslim brother". In a translation provided by the ADL, the poster stated it would reveal "the real terrorist who caused the killing of our children in Palestine, and our brothers in Iraq and Afghanistan", a phrase that has been used by Palestinians to protest U.S. support of Israel.

Movie poster for Innocence of Bn Laden [sic] at the Vine Theater, June 2012

The film was supported and promoted by pastor Terry Jones, known for a Quran-burning controversy, which also led to riots around the world. Jones said that he planned to show a 13-minute trailer at his church, the Dove World Outreach Center in Gainesville, Florida, on September 11, 2012. It was reported on September 14, 2012, that a planned screening by a Hindu organization in Toronto would be coupled with "snippets from other movies that are offensive to Christians and Hindus". Because of security concerns, no public venue was willing to show the film, although the group still planned on showing the film in the future to a private audience of about 200 people. Siobhán Dowling of The Guardian reported that "a far-right Islamophobic group in Germany", the Pro Germany Citizens' Movement, had uploaded the trailer on their own website and wanted to show the entire film, but authorities were attempting to prevent it.

=== Blocking of the YouTube video ===
The video clips were posted to YouTube on July 1 by user "sam bacile"; however, by September, the film had been dubbed into Arabic and was drawn to the attention of the Arabic-speaking world by blogger Morris Sadek. Sadek's own Egyptian citizenship had been revoked. A two-minute excerpt dubbed in Arabic was broadcast on September 9 by Sheikh Khalad Abdalla.

YouTube voluntarily blocked the video in Egypt and Libya, and blocked the video in Indonesia, Saudi Arabia, Malaysia, India, and Singapore due to local laws, while Turkey, Brazil, and Russia initiated steps to get the video blocked. Google, Inc., the owner of YouTube, also blocked the video in Libya and Egypt citing "the very difficult situation" in those countries. In September 2012, the governments of Afghanistan, Bangladesh, Sudan, and Pakistan blocked YouTube for not removing the video, saying that the website would remain suspended until the film was removed. Government authorities in Chechnya and Dagestan issued orders to internet providers to block YouTube, and Iran announced that it was blocking Google and Gmail. Google also agreed to block the movie in Jordan.

The White House asked YouTube to review whether to continue hosting the video at all under the company's policies. YouTube said the video fell within its guidelines as the video is against Islam, but not against Muslim people, and thus not considered "hate speech". Ben Wizner of the American Civil Liberties Union said of this, "It does make us nervous when the government throws its weight behind any requests for censorship."

=== Ninth Circuit court rulings on removal ===
On February 26, 2014, the United States Court of Appeals for the Ninth Circuit ordered YouTube to remove the video from its website by a 2–1 majority. The ruling was in response to a complaint by actress Cindy Lee Garcia, who had objected to the use of her performance, which had been partially dubbed for its inclusion in Innocence of Muslims. Garcia had believed during production that she was appearing in a film called Desert Warrior, which was described as a "historical Arabian Desert adventure film", and was unaware that anti-Islamic material would be added at the post-production stage. Garcia had argued that she held a copyright interest in her performance.

In May 2015, in an en banc opinion, the Ninth Circuit reversed the panel's decision, vacating the order for the preliminary injunction. Ibrahim Hooper, the National Communications Director and spokesperson for the Council on American-Islamic Relations (CAIR), advised that people should not watch the film.

== Reactions and controversies ==
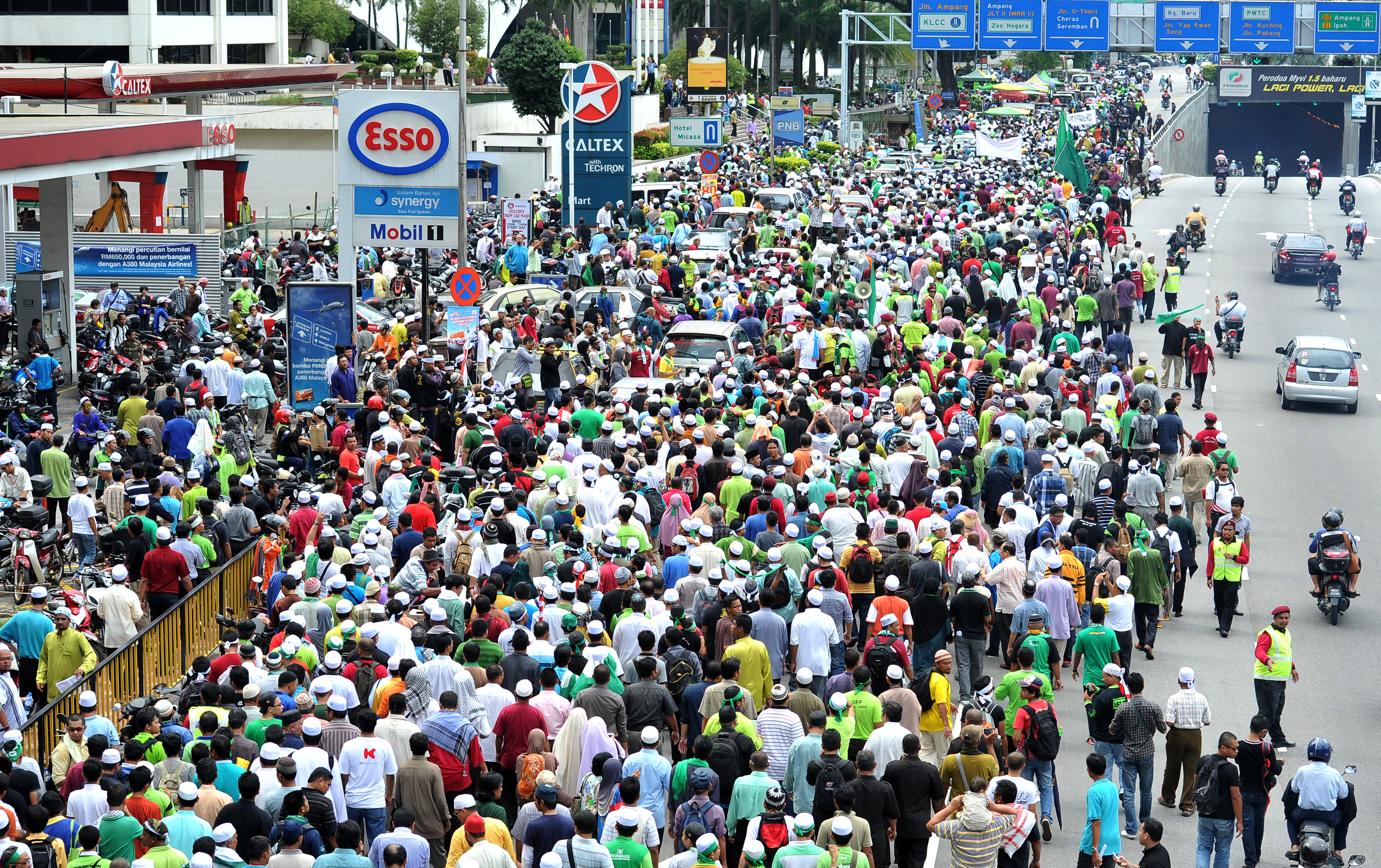
Protesters in Kuala Lumpur take to the streets to demonstrate against the film.

In response to the film's release, protests and demonstrations against it were held in the Middle East, North Africa, Asia, and Europe. Several protests took place at US consulates or embassies, such at the embassy in Cairo, Egypt, Sanaa, Yemen, and Tunis, Tunisia. The protests resulted in over 50 deaths, including 23 in Pakistan. The 2012 Benghazi attack occurred the night after the protests in Cairo. For days after the attack, CIA analysts believed the Benghazi incident had been “spontaneously inspired” by the Cairo incident, which Benghazi residents could view on an Egyptian satellite television service, though analysts later concluded the attack had been planned in advance. On the day after the attack, Ansar al-Sharia claimed partial responsibility, though it also said "it was a spontaneous popular uprising in response to what happened by the West." The early conflicting accounts generated significant political controversy during subsequent investigations through 2015.

== See also ==
- 2005 Quran desecration controversy
- 2012 Afghanistan Quran burning protests
- Fitna (2008) and subsequent protests and trial
- Joseph Burstyn, Inc. v. Wilson
- Jyllands-Posten Muhammad cartoons controversy
- The Message (1976 film)
- The Satanic Verses controversy
- South Park controversies § Censorship of the depiction of Muhammad
- Submission (2004)
