= Bill Heck =

American actor (born 1978)

- Born: September 26, 1978 (age 48); Phoenix, Arizona, U.S.
- Education: University of Evansville (BFA); New York University (MFA)
- Years active: 2007–present
- Spouse: Maggie Lacey (m. 2011)

Bill Heck is an American actor who has appeared on Broadway and in television shows, such as The Leftovers, I Know What You Did Last Summer and The Old Man, and films, including in the role of Billy Knapp in the Coen brothers' Western The Ballad of Buster Scruggs.

== Early life and education ==
Heck was born in Phoenix, Arizona, and moved to Libertyville, Illinois, as a child. He graduated from the University of Evansville in Indiana and went to New York University to gain a graduate degree in acting.

== Career ==
Heck took his first Broadway leading role in the Cabaret revival in 2014. Off-Broadway, Heck starred in Horton Foote's epic The Orphans' Home Cycle, Angels in America with Buster Scruggs co-star Zoe Kazan, and Water by the Spoonful.

On television, Heck had a guest role in The Alienist and appeared in The Leftovers.

At L.A. Outfest in 2013, Heck won the Grand Jury Award for Best Actor for his role in Pit Stop.

Heck appeared as Billy Knapp in the vignette "The Gal Who Got Rattled", one of six separate stories of the American Wild West in the Coen brothers-directed The Ballad of Buster Scruggs. To prepare for the role, Heck read The Oregon Trail: A New American Journey by Rinker Buck.

== Personal life ==
Heck married Broadway co-star Maggie Lacey in 2011.

== Filmography ==
=== Film ===
Year	Title	Role	Notes
2010	Nonames	Simon	
2013	Pit Stop	Gabe	
2014	The Amazing Spider-Man 2	G-5 Co-Pilot / Karl Fiers / The Finisher	
2016	After Adderall	Gerard	
2018	1985	Dancer	
2018	The Ballad of Buster Scruggs	Billy Knapp	Segment: "The Gal Who Got Rattled"
2020	Small Town Wisconsin	Chuck	
2020	I'm Your Woman	Eddie	
2024	Hold Your Breath	Henry Bellum	
2026	Primetime	Stone Phillips	

=== Television ===
Year	Show	Role	Notes
2007	Numbers	Barista	1 episode
2007	NCIS	Cory Mitas	1 episode
2007	CSI: NY	Brett Dohn	1 episode
2007	The Closer	Wesley Reed	2 episodes
2008	Medium	David Draper	1 episode
2009	Without a Trace	Jonah Westfield	1 episode
2009	The Unit	Philip	1 episode
2011	The Big C	Mike	1 episode
2011–2012	Pan Am	Graham	2 episodes
2012	Person of Interest	Rick Morris	1 episode
2012	Elementary	Ty Morstan	1 episode
2014	Taxi Brooklyn	Gregg James	Main role
2014–2015	The Leftovers	Darren	3 episodes (seasons 1–2)
2015	The Americans	Neil	2 episodes
2016	Mercy Street	Philip Starks	2 episodes
2016	Feed the Beast	Dante DiPaolo	1 episode
2017	Sleepy Hollow	Mitch Talbot	1 episode
2018	Instinct	Roman Cecchino	1 episode
2018	The Alienist	Beecham	3 episodes (season 1)
2019	Bluff City Law	Campbell Mathers	1 episode
2019	Ray Donovan	Young Mickey Donovan	1 episode
2020	Little America	Jack	1 episode
2020–2022	Locke & Key	Rendell Locke	Recurring role (seasons 1–3)
2021	I Know What You Did Last Summer	Bruce Grant	Main role
2022	Ray Donovan: The Movie	Young Mickey Donovan	Television film
2022–2024	The Old Man	Young Dan Chase	Main role
2024	Teacup	Lieutenant Olsen	4 episodes
2026	Your Friends & Neighbors	Mark	1 episode
2027	Wild Things	Jimmy Lavery	Upcoming miniseries
