= Perugia Press =

American poetry press

- Founded: 1997
- Founder: Susan Kan
- Country of origin: United States
- Headquarters location: Florence, Massachusetts
- Publication types: books
- Fiction genres: poetry
- Official website: www.perugiapress.com

Perugia Press is an American not-for-profit poetry press located in Florence, Massachusetts and founded in 1997 by Editor and Director Susan Kan. The press publishes one collection of poetry each year, by a woman poet chosen from its annual book contest, the Perugia Press Prize.

== History ==
Notable authors published by Perugia Press include Diane Gilliam Fisher (Kettle Bottom, 2004), Melanie Braverman, Frannie Lindsay, Jennifer K. Sweeney, Lynne Thompson, and Nancy K. Pearson. Authors have been recipients of many awards including the James Laughlin Award, the L. L. Winship/PEN New England Award, the Great Lakes Colleges Association New Writers Award, the Ohioana Library Association Poetry Book of the Year award, the Pushcart Prize, NEA Literature Fellowships, Massachusetts Cultural Council grants, and numerous other honors. Perugia Press titles have been reviewed by Valparisio Poetry Review, Prairie Schooner, Blackbird, and other publications.
