= List of stage names: J =

This list of stage names lists names used by those in the entertainment industry, alphabetically by their stage name's surname (or the best approximation) followed by the given name (or the best approximation) where the surname begins with "J". One-word stage names are presented in List of one-word stage names.

Stage name	Birth name	Life	Notability	Notes
David J	David John Haskins	1957–	English musician	
Jessie J	Jessica Ellen Cornish	1988–	English singer	
Jessy J	Jessica Arellano	1982–	American saxophonist	
LL Cool J	James Todd Smith	1968–	American rapper, songwriter, record producer and actor	
Ray J	William Ray Norwood Jr.	1981–	American singer and actor	
Tony Jaa	Tatchakorn Yeerum	1976–	Thai martial artist, actor and stuntman	Also known as Jaa Phanom, Phanom Yeerum, and Thatchakon Yiram
Wolfman Jack	Robert Weston Smith	1938–1995	American disc jockey	
Felix Jackson	Felix Raphael Joachimson	1902–1992	German-American screenwriter and film producer	
Lou Jacobi	Louis Harold Jacobovitch	1913–2009	Canadian actor	
William Jacoby	William Jayne	1969–	American actor	
Luke Jacobz	Luke Jacob Ashwood	1981–	Australian actor	
Claude Jade	Claude Marcelle Jorré	1948–2006	French actress	
Nicky Jam	Nick Rivera Caminero	1981–	American singer and actor	
Anthony James	James Anthony	1942–2020	American character actor	
Art James	Arthur Efimchik	1929–2004	American television presenter	
Boney James	James Oppenheim	1961–	American musician, songwriter and record producer	
Brian James	Brian Robertson	1955–2025	English musician (The Damned and The Lords of the New Church)	
Dennis James	Demie James Sposa	1917–1997	American television presenter	
Duncan James	Duncan Matthew James Inglis	1978–	English singer and actor (Blue)	
Elmore James	Elmore Brooks	1918–1963	American blues musician, singer, songwriter and bandleader	
Etta James	Jamesetta Hawkins	1938–2012	American singer	
Gordon James	Sydney Lynn	1878–1949	English actor	
Kevin James	Kevin Knipfing	1965–	American comedian and actor	
Joni James	Joan Babbo	1930–2022	American singer	
Josh James	Josh Dubovie	1990–	English singer	
Lil James	James Weddle Lacy	Unknown	American rapper	
Lily James	Lily Chloe Ninette Thomson	1989–	English actress	
Mark James	Francis Rodney Zambon	1940–2024	American songwriter	
Markus James	Markus Klepaski	1975–	American musician (Breaking Benjamin)	
Rick James	James Johnson	1948–2004	American singer-songwriter, musician and record producer	
Robert James	Robert James McAllister	1924–2004	Scottish actor	
Sid James	Solomon Cohen	1913–1976	South African-English actor and comedian	
Sonny James	James Hugh Loden	1928–2016	American country singer and songwriter	
Theo James	Theodore Peter James Kinnaird Taptiklis	1984–	English actor	
Tommy James	Thomas Gregory Jackson	1947–	American musician (Tommy James and the Shondells)	
Trinidad James	Nicholaus Joseph Williams	1987–	Trinidadian-American rapper	
Jenna Jameson	Jenna Massoli	1974–	American model and former pornographic actress	
Junaid Jamshed	Junaid Khan	1964–2016	Pakistani singer-songwriter	
La Jana	Henrietta Hiebel	1905–1940	Austrian-German actress	
Thomas Jane	Thomas Elliott III	1969–	American actor	
Conrad Janis	Conrad Janowitz	1928–2022	American actor and musician	
Dorothy Janis	Dorothy Jones	1912–2010	American actress	
Elsie Janis	Elsie Bierbower	1889–1956	American actress, singer, songwriter and screenwriter	
Marie Jansen	Harriet Mary Johnson	1857–1914	American actress and singer	
Steve Jansen	Stephen Batt	1959–	English musician, composer and record producer	
David Janssen	David Meyer	1931–1980	American actor	
Anna Jantar	Anna Szmeterling	1950–1980	Polish singer	
Frank Jarvis	John Francis Train	1941–2010	British actor	
Meera Jasmine	Jasmine Mary Joseph	1982–	Indian actress	
David Jason	David John White	1940–	English actor	
Rick Jason	Richard Jacobson	1923–2000	American actor	
Neville Jason	Neville Abraham Jacobson	1934–2015	English actor	
Sybil Jason	Sybil Jacobson	1927–2011	American actress	
Jam Master Jay	Jason William Mizell	1965–2002	American musician and DJ	
Jazzy Jay	John Byas	1961–	American hip hop DJ and producer	Also known as The Original Jazzy Jay and DJ Jazzy Jay
Shuba Jay	Shubasini Jeyaratnam	1976–2014	Malaysian performer and actress	
Tony Jay	Maurice Jacobs	1933–2006	British-American actor	
Courtney Jaye	Courtney Jaye Goldberg	1978–	American singer-songwriter	
Jennifer Jayne	Jennifer Jones	1931–2006	English actress	
Michael Jayston	Michael James	1935–2024	English actor	
Prince Jazzbo	Linval Roy Carter	1951–2013	Jamaican reggae and dancehall deejay and producer	
Gloria Jean	Gloria Jean Schoonover	1926–2018	American actress and singer	
Norma Jean	Norma Jean Beasler	1938–	American country singer	
Jazzy Jeff	Jeffrey Allen Townes	1965–	American rapper and actor	Also known as DJ Jazzy Jeff or "Jazz"
Jim Jefferies	Geoffrey James Nugent	1977–	Australian comedian	
Fran Jeffries	Fran Makris	1937–2016	American singer	
Noor Jehan	Allah Wasai	1926–2000	Pakistani singer and actress	
Richard Jeni	Richard Colangelo	1957–2007	American comedian and actor	
Allen Jenkins	Alfred McGonegal	1900–1974	American character actor and singer	
Claudia Jennings	Mary Chesterton	1949–1979	American actress and model	
Diane Jergens	Dianne Irgens	1935–2018	American actress	
Michael Jerome	Michael Jerome Moore	1967–	American musician (Better Than Ezra)	
Paul Jerricho	Paul Graham Coulthard	1948–	English actor	
Paul Jesson	Paul Jackson	1946–	English actor	
Joan Jett	Joan Larkin	1958–	American musician, record producer and actress (The Runaways)	
Ann Jillian	Ann Nauseda	1950–	American retired actress and singer	
Joyce Jillson	Joyce Twichell	1945–2004	American columnist, author, actress and astrologer	
Lil' JJ	James Lewis III	1990–	American actor and comedian	Also known as Big JJ
Yung Joc	Jasiel Robinson	1980–	American rapper	
Beau Jocque	Andrus Espre	1953–1999	American musician and songwriter	
Big Joe	Joseph Spalding	1955–	Jamaican deejay and record producer	
Fat Joe	Joseph Cartagena	1970–	American rapper (D.I.T.C.)	
Phil Joel	Phil Joel Urry	1973–	New Zealand musician (Newsboys)	
Alain Johannes	Alain Johannes Moschulski	1962–	Chilean-American musician and singer (Eleven)	
Dr. John	Malcolm John Rebennack Jr.	1941–2019	American singer and songwriter	
Elton John	Reginald Dwight	1947–	English singer, musician and composer	Used the name Elton John professionally before adopting it as his legal name in September 1972
Rosamund John	Nora Rosamund Jones	1913–1998	English actress	
Scatman John	John Larkin	1942–1999	American musician	
Southside Johnny	John Lyon	1948–	American singer-songwriter (Southside Johnny and the Asbury Jukes)	
Milton Johns	John Robert Milton	1938–	English character actor	
Jake Johnson	Mark Jake Johnson Weinberger	1978–	American actor and filmmaker	
Wilko Johnson	John Wilkinson	1947–2022	English musician, singer and songwriter (Dr. Feelgood)	
Freedy Johnston	Fred Fatzer	1961–	American singer-songwriter	
Pete Jolly	Pete Ceragioli Jr.	1932–2004	American musician	
Al Jolson	Asa Yoelson	1886–1950	Lithuanian-American singer, comedian, actor and vaudevillian	
Lil Jon	Jonathan Smith	1972–	American rapper	
Buck Jones	Charles Frederick Gebhart	1891–1942	American actor	Also known as Charles Jones
Chloe Jones	Melinda Taylor	1975–2005	American pornographic actress	
Jennifer Jones	Phylis Isley	1919–2009	American actress	
Jenny Jones	Janina Stronski	1946–	Canadian television presenter and comedian	
John Paul Jones	John Baldwin	1946–	English musician (Led Zeppelin)	
Kacey Jones	Gail Zeiler	1950–2016	American singer-songwriter, producer and humorist	
L. Q. Jones	Justice McQueen Jr.	1927–2022	American actor and director	
Paul Jones	Paul Pond	1942–	English singer and actor (Manfred Mann)	
Samantha Jones	Jean Owen	1943–	English former singer	
Tom Jones	Thomas John Woodward	1940–	Welsh singer	
Xuso Jones	Jesús Segovia Pérez	1989–	Spanish singer and composer	
Spike Jonze	Adam Spiegel	1969–	American director, producer, screenwriter and actor	
Angelina Jordan	Angelina Jordan Astar	2006–	Norwegian singer	
Clifford Jordan	George Jorgensen Jr.	1931–1993	American jazz musician	
Ronny Jordan	Ronald Simpson	1962–2014	English musician	
Will Jordan	William Rauch	1927–2018	American impressionist, character actor and comedian	
José José	José Sosa Ortiz	1948–2019	Mexican singer and actor	
Paulo José	Paulo José Gómez de Souza	1937–2021	Brazilian actor	
Angela Josephine	Angela Louis	1967–	American folk singer-songwriter, musician and author	
Darwin Joston	Francis Darwin Solomon	1937–1998	American actor	
Jacqueline Joubert	Jacqueline Pierre	1921–2005	French television announcer, producer and director	
Leatrice Joy	Leatrice Johanna Zeidler	1893–1985	American actress	
Vance Joy	James Keogh	1987–	Australian singer-songwriter	
Brenda Joyce	Betty Leabo	1917–2009	American actress	
Elaine Joyce	Elaine Joyce Pinchot	1945–	American actress	
Ella Joyce	Cherron Hoye	1954–	American actress	
Yootha Joyce	Yootha Joyce Needham	1927–1980	English actress	
Naomi Judd	Diana Judd	1946–2022	American country singer	
Wynonna Judd	Christina Claire Ciminella	1964–	American singer	
Janet Julian	Janet Louise Johnson	N/A	American actress	Also known as Janet Lansbury
Miranda July	Miranda Jennifer Grossinger	1974–	American film director, screenwriter, actress and author	
Mark Boone Junior	Mark Heidrich	1955–	American actor	
Bigg Jus	Justin Ingleton	Unknown	American rapper (Company Flow)	Also known as Bigg Justoleum and Lune TNS
Samantha Juste	Sandra Slater	1944–2014	English model and television presenter	
John Justin	John Justinian de Ledesma	1917–2002	English actor	
