= Savageau =

Savageau is a surname. Notable people with the surname include:

- Cheryl Savageau (born 1950), Native American poet
- Michael Antonio Savageau (born 1940), American engineer
