= New England Literature Program =

Academic program

- Formation: May 1975; 51 years ago
- Founder: Alan Howes; Walter Clerk
- Locations: Alton Bay, New Hampshire; Ann Arbor, Michigan
- Director: James Pinto
- Parent organization: University of Michigan
- Students: 30–40
- Website: https://lsa.umich.edu/nelp

The New England Literature Program (NELP) is an academic program run by the University of Michigan that takes place off-campus during the spring half-term. University of Michigan faculty and other staff teach the courses, and students earn regular University of Michigan credit. The program has been in existence since 1975 and has an endowed permanent directorship in the English Department to ensure NELP's continuation.

The program, founded by English professors Walter Clark and Alan Howes, takes place at Camp Kabeyun on Lake Winnipesaukee in Alton Bay, New Hampshire. The program's location has shifted throughout the years, previously taking place at Camp Belknap and Camp Kehonka in Wolfeboro, New Hampshire, and at Camp Wohelo and Camp Mataponi on Sebago Lake in Maine. NELP lasts for six and a half weeks, with around 40 students and 13 staff members participating each year. In addition to formal academic work in literature and writing, staff and students offer non-credit instruction in canoeing, camping, art, and nature studies. Students also teach or co-teach classes as part of the NELP program. Students go on several hiking and camping trips, including a climb up Mount Washington, throughout the NELP program. Students at NELP live without cell phones, recorded music, drugs, alcohol, or computers.

== Educational philosophy ==
The course description of NELP states that, "Diverse kinds of learning are all valuable and pleasurable," suggesting that intellectual and physical challenges are often parallel with each kind of learning reinforcing the others. The program is run cooperatively: All participants belong to work groups. Work responsibilities rotate among the groups, which prepare meals, wash dishes, and clean common areas. NELP begins with a work day during which equipment is unpacked and camp set up, and it ends with another work day. The students and staff live together during the duration of NELP.

== The academic program ==
NELP students earn 9 hours of credit. While NELP’s academic work is said to be taught as a single integrated academic experience, the credits nonetheless appear on transcripts as three separate courses.

The program centers around New England authors, including 18th and 19th-century writers such as Nathaniel Hawthorne, Ralph Waldo Emerson, Henry David Thoreau, Emily Dickinson, Frederick Douglass, Herman Melville, and W. E. B. Du Bois, as well as more modern writers like Sarah Orne Jewett, Robert Frost, Wallace Stevens, Louise Glück, Carolyn Chute, E. E. Cummings, Galway Kinnell, Jorie Graham, Morgan Talty, Ruth Stone, and Cheryl Savageau. In particular, Thoreau's Walden has been described as the Bible of NELP.

NELP's curriculum prioritizes creative writing, especially journal writing. The courses at NELP are graded based on the students' completion of a reading list, journal work, and class participation.

== Alumni ==
The NELP program has had participants who have gone on to careers in writing and the arts. Among those are Mark Leibovich, a writer for the New York Times; Diane Cook, formerly a producer at Public Radio International's This American Life and author of Man V. Nature, a 2014 book of short stories published by Harper Collins; Chicago Tribune columnist Eric Zorn; food journalist Francis Lam; indie folk singer Chris Bathgate; and bluegrass singer Rebecca Frazier.

In 2018, alumna Dana Nessel was elected Attorney General of the State of Michigan.
