= Edward J. Delaney =

American author

- Born: Fall River, Massachusetts, U.S.
- Education: Fairfield University (BS); Boston University (MS)
- Occupation: Writer
- Writing career
- Genres: Fiction, nonfiction
- Website: edwardjdelaney.org

Edward J. Delaney is an American author.

Delaney is the author of six books of fiction, the novels Warp & Weft (2004), Broken Irish (2011), Follow The Sun (2018), The Acrobat (2022) and Hard Margins (2025), and the short-story collections The Drowning and Other Stories (1999) and The Big Impossible: Novellas + Stories (2019). He was awarded the L. L. Winship/PEN New England Award for Warp & Weft; Broken Irish received the Grand Prize at the New England Book Festival. His short story ‘The Drowning’ appeared in The Atlantic Monthly and was included in both the Prize Stories: The O. Henry Awards and Best American Short Stories, as well as being named a finalist for the National Magazine Awards. He has been a faculty member at Roger Williams University in Bristol, Rhode Island, since 1990, where he is currently a professor of Creative Writing. He is the editor of the literary journal Mount Hope. He received a 2008 Literary Fellowship from the National Endowment for the Arts.

He has published numerous short stories in The Atlantic Monthly and other literary magazines and quarterlies. Delaney was a reporter for The Denver Post and a columnist for The Gazette of Colorado Springs, and also wrote for the Chicago Tribune. In 2009, Delaney co-authored Born to Play by Dustin Pedroia of the Boston Red Sox. He has written for PBS's POV Docs website and for the Nieman Journalism Lab at Harvard University.

Delaney received a B.S. in finance from Fairfield University in 1979 and an M.S. in mass communications from Boston University in 1982.
