= PEN New England Award =

Annual literary award given by PEN America

The PEN New England Award (previously L. L. Winship/PEN New England Award and Laurence L. & Thomas Winship/PEN New England Award) is awarded annually by PEN New England (today PEN America Boston) to honor a New England author or book with a New England setting or subject. The award was established in 1975 by The Boston Globe in conjunction with PEN to honor the veteran Boston Globe editor Laurence L. Winship.

Since 2005, the award has been presented in three categories: fiction, non-fiction, and poetry with each winner receiving $1,000. For one year in 2012, the award was called the Laurence L. & Thomas Winship/PEN New England Award in honor of father and son, Thomas Winship, both long-time Boston Globe editors. It was renamed to simply PEN New England Award starting with the 2013 award.

The award presentation is sponsored in part by the JFK Presidential Library. The award is one of many PEN awards sponsored by International PEN affiliates in over 145 PEN centres around the world.

== Winners ==
=== 1975-2004 ===
L. L. Winship/PEN New England Award winners
Year	Author	Title	Ref.
1975	Andre Dubus	Separate Flights	
1976	Claude-Anne Lopez	The Private Franklin: The Man and His Family	
1977	E. B. White	Letters of E. B. White	
1978	Martha Saxton	Louisa May Alcott: A Modern Biography	
1979	Abbott Lowell Cummings	The Framed Houses of Massachusetts Bay, 1625-1725	
1980	Millicent Bell	Marquand: An American Life	
1981	Estelle Jussim	Slave to Beauty: The Eccentric Life and Controversial Career of F. Holland Day, Photographer, Publisher, Aesthete	
1982	William Sargent	Shallow Waters: A Year on Cape Cod's Pleasant Bay	
1983	?		
1984	Bernd Heinrich	In a Patch of Fireweed: A Biologist's Life in the Field	
1985	Susan Cheever	Home Before Dark	
1986	Diana Korzenik	Drawn to Art: A Nineteenth Century American Dream	
1987	Claudia Koonz	Mothers in the Fatherland: Women, the Family and Nazi Politics	
1988	Susan Quinn	A Mind of Her Own: The Life of Karen Horney	
1989	Jill Ker Conway	The Road from Coorain	
1990	Tracy Kidder	Among Schoolchildren	
1991	Mary Oliver	House of Light	
1992	Nicholas Fox Weber	Patron Saints: Five Rebels Who Opened America to a New Art, 1928-1943	
1993	Jack Beatty	The Rascal King: Life and Times of James Michael Curley (1874-1958)	
1994	?		
1995	?		
1996	Jane Brox	Here and Nowhere Else: Late Seasons of a Farm and Its Family	
1997	Jan Swafford	Charles Ives: A Life With Music	
1998	Anita Shreve	The Weight of Water	
1999	Donald Hall	Without: Poems	
2000	John W. Dower	Embracing Defeat: Japan in the Wake of World War II	
2001	Jay Wright	Transfigurations: Collected Poems	
2002	Elizabeth McCracken	Niagara Falls All Over Again	
2003	Adam Haslett	You Are Not a Stranger Here: Stories	
2004	Joan Leegant	An Hour in Paradise	
2004	Carlo Rotella	Cut Time: An Education at the Fights	

=== 2005-present ===
PEN New England Award winners
Year	Category	Author	Title	Ref.
2005	Fiction	Jennifer Haigh	Baker Towers	
2005	Non-fiction	Swanee Hunt	This Was Not Our War: Bosnian Women Reclaiming the Peace	
2005	Poetry	Kevin Goodan	In the Ghost-House Acquainted	
2006	Fiction	Edward J. Delaney	Warp & Weft	
2006	Non-fiction	Leo Damrosch	Jean-Jacques Rousseau: Restless Genius	
2006	Poetry	Stanley Kunitz	The Wild Braid: A Poet Reflects on a Century in The Garden	
2007	Fiction	K. C. Frederick	Inland	
2007	Non-fiction	Sebastian Junger	A Death in Belmont	
2007	Poetry	Louise Glück	Averno: Poems	
2008	Fiction	Rishi Reddi	Karma and Other Stories	
2008	Non-fiction	Kristen Laine	American Band: Music, Dreams, and Coming of Age in the Heartland	
2008	Poetry	Ann Killough	Beloved Idea	
2009	Fiction	Margot Livesey	The House on Fortune Street	
2009	Non-fiction	Patrick Tracey	Stalking Irish Madness	
2009	Poetry	Nancy K. Pearson	Two Minutes of Light	
2010	Fiction	Anne Sanow	Triple Time	
2010	Non-fiction	Elyssa East	Dogtown: Death and Enchantment in a New England Ghost Town	
2010	Poetry	Meg Kearney	Home, Now	
2011	Fiction	Kermit Moyer	The Chester Chronicles	
2011	Non-fiction	Jerald Walker	Street Shadows: A Memoir of Race, Rebellion, and Redemption	
2011	Poetry	Charles Douthat	Blue for Oceans	
2012	Fiction	Yannick Murphy	The Call	
2012	Non-fiction	Mitchell Zuckoff	Lost In Shangri-La	
2012	Poetry	Elizabeth Willis	Address	
2013	Fiction	Heidi Julavits	The Vanishers	
2013	Non-fiction	Bernd Heinrich	Life Everlasting: The Animal Way of Death	
2013	Poetry	David Huddle	Blacksnake at the Family Reunion	
2014	Fiction	Jennifer Haigh	News from Heaven	
2014	Non-fiction	Doug Bauer	What Happens Next?: Matters of Life and Death	
2014	Poetry	Karen Skolfield	Frost in the Low Areas	
2015	Fiction	Carolyn Chute	Treat Us Like Dogs and We Will Become Wolves	
2015	Non-fiction	Kevin Birmingham	The Most Dangerous Book: The Battle for James Joyce’s Ulysees	
2015	Poetry	Wesley McNair	The Lost Child	
2016	Fiction	Jim Shepard	The Book of Aron	
2016	Non-fiction	Rinker Buck	The Oregon Trail: A New American Journey	
2016	Poetry	Reginald Dwayne Betts	Bastards of the Reagan Era	
2017	Fiction	Robin MacArthur	Half Wild	
2017	Non-fiction	Matthew Desmond	Evicted: Poverty and Profit in the American City	
2017	Poetry	David Rivard	Standoff	
2018	No award			
