= Pit Stop (2013 film) =

- Official release poster
- Directed by: Yen Tan
- Written by: Yen Tan; David Lowery
- Produced by: Kelly Williams; Jonathan Duffy; James M. Johnston; Eric Steele
- Starring: Bill Heck; Marcus DeAnda; Amy Seimetz; John Merriman; Alfredo Maduro; Corby Sullivan; Bailey Bass
- Cinematography: HutcH
- Edited by: Don Swaynos
- Music by: Curtis Glenn Heath
- Production companies: Mile Marker Film; Vilcek Foundation
- Distributed by: Wolfe Releasing
- Release dates: January 21, 2013 (Sundance); January 7, 2014 (United States)
- Running time: 80 minutes
- Country: United States
- Language: English

Pit Stop is a 2013 American drama film directed by Yen Tan. The film tells the story of two gay men in a small town in Texas.

== Plot introduction ==
The majority of the film involves the men's past relationships and struggles of being gay in a small Southern town.

== Cast ==
The film stars Bill Heck and Marcus DeAnda as Gabe and Ernesto, the protagonists. The film also stars Amy Seimetz as Gabe's ex-wife Shannon and Alfredo Maduro as Ernesto's former partner Luis, both of whom are still involved in their ex-partners' lives.

== Premiere ==
Pit Stop premiered at the 2013 Sundance Film Festival. It was released digitally on January 7, 2014, and on DVD on February 4, 2014, by Wolfe Releasing.

== Awards ==
The film won the Texas Grand Jury Prize at the 2013 Dallas International Film Festival and the Louise LeQuire Award for Best Screenplay at the 2013 Nashville Film Festival.

At the 2013 Los Angeles Outfest, Heck and DeAnda won the Grand Jury Award for Best Actor for their roles as Gabe and Ernesto.
