= Diana Korzenik =

American artist and educator (born 1941)

- Born: March 15, 1941 (age 85); New York City, U.S.
- Education: Brooklyn Museum Art School; Vassar College; Oberlin College (BA); Harvard Graduate School of Education (EdD)
- Occupations: Artist; educator; author; collector; benefactor
- Parent(s): Harold Korzenik; Lillian Shapiro

Diana Korzenik (born March 15, 1941) is an American artist, educator, author, collector, and benefactor.

== Early life and education ==
Diana Korzenik was born March 15, 1941, in Brooklyn, New York, to father Harold, a labor lawyer, and mother Lillian, a fashion designer who, on behalf of nonprofit organizations, solicited and auctioned off the works of rising artists. Lillian encouraged Diana and her sister Ruth (Korzenik) Franklin (1935–2000), who would go on to become curator of the Arts of Africa, Oceania, and the Americas at the Cantor Center for Visual Arts, Stanford University, to refine their art interests and practices.

In 1948 Harold Korzenik arranged for seven-year-old Diana to meet Anna Mary Robertson Moses (commonly known as Grandma Moses), who gave the girl a small painting of a New England white clapboard house. In 2015 Korzenik donated that painting to the Bennington Museum along with her own “Bennington House” (1965), thereby belatedly fulfilling a promise to reciprocate Moses's gift. The two paintings were exhibited side by side in the 2017 Bennington Museum–Shelburne Museum exhibit “Grandma Moses: American Modern”. Korzenik's “Anna Mary Robertson Moses: Rethinking Self-Taught” was included in the exhibition catalog, Grandma Moses: American Modern (Skira Rizzoli Publications, 2016).

Korzenik studied at the Brooklyn Museum Art School and at Vassar College (1957–59), where she met her chief mentor, Rosemarie Beck Rosemarie Beck, as well as at Yale Norfolk Art School, and the New York Studio School.

Korzenik graduated from Oberlin College (B.A., 1961). Thereafter, she studied art history at Columbia and taught for five years at an East Harlem public school, which deepened her curiosity about how and why children create art. She went on to study the psychology of art under Rudolf Arnheim at the Harvard Graduate School of Education, earning an Ed.D. in 1972.

== Career ==
In 1972 Korzenik joined the Department of Art Education at the Massachusetts College of Art and Design, the United States’ first publicly supported art school, as chairperson, a position she held until shortly before she retired with emerita status in 1987.

In 1985, the University Press of New England published Korzenik's Drawn to Art: A Nineteenth-Century American Dream (University Press of New England, 1985), which demonstrates how a state law mandating public art education energized the Massachusetts economy and enriched the visual culture of nineteenth-century America. The book received the Boston Globe’s L. L. Winship Award in 1986.

In Objects of American Art Education (Huntington Library, 2004), which received the American Library Association's Leab Award in 2005, Korzenik contextualized the tangible as well as philosophical evidence of America's democratizing art enterprise, a book that grew out of the Huntington's acquisition of her professional teaching collection of Art Education Books and Ephemera. Assembled over 30 years and encompassing more than 1,000 artifacts—drawing desks and cards, tracing slates, paper-weaving kits, blocks, stencils, paint boxes, geometric forms, and approximately 450 instructional and theoretical books

For the benefit of other researchers, Korzenik has donated the Cross Family Archive to the American Antiquarian Society, the Mabel Spofford Collection to the Cape Ann Museum, her correspondence to and from Rudolf Arnheim to the Smithsonian Institution, Drawn to Art research materials to the New Hampshire Historical Society, and painted, large-plate tintype portraits to Historic New England.

In 1994, Korzenik founded the Friends of the Longfellow House to help promote and support the Longfellow House–Washington's Headquarters National Historic Site in Cambridge, Massachusetts.

== Collections ==
Her work is included in the permanent collections of the Brooklyn Museum, the Bennington Museum and Ventfort Hall, in Lenox, Massachusetts.

== Bibliography ==
=== Books ===
- Author, Drawn to Art: A Nineteenth-Century American Dream (Hanover, N.H.: University Press of New England, 1985).
- Author, with Maurice Brown, Art-making and Education (Champaign: University of Illinois Press, 1993).
- Editor, with Caroline Sloat and Georgia Barnhill, The Cultivation of American Artists (New Castle, Del.: Oak Knoll Press, 1998).
- Author, Objects of American Art Education (San Marino, Calif.: Huntington Library, 2004).
- Author, Lithuania to Brooklyn: The Rabbi Daniel and Minnie Shapiro Family (Newton, Mass., 2019).

=== Essays in edited volumes ===
- “Collecting and Donating Collections to Art Libraries and Museums,” in The Arts and Cognition, ed. David Perkins and Barbara Leondar (Baltimore: Johns Hopkins University Press, 1977).
- "Seeing Myself in the Context of My Community: An International Student Reflects on Studying Art and Art Education in the United States," in "Art Education", co-author with Sharon Wilson (1986) DOI: 10.1080/00043125.1986.11649780
- “The Art Education of Working Women, 1873–1903,” in Pilgrims and Pioneers: New England Women in the Arts, ed. Alicia Faxon and Sylvia Moore (New York, N.Y.: Middlemarch Arts Press, 1987).
- “The Artist as a Model Learner,” in The Educational Legacy of Romanticism, ed. John Willinsky (Waterloo, Ont.: Wilfrid Laurier University Press, 1990).
- “A Developmental History of Art Education,” in Framing the Past: Essays in Art Education, ed. Donald Soucy and Mary Ann Stankiewicz (Reston, Va.: National Arts Education Association, 1990).
- “The Changing Concept of Artistic Giftedness,” in The Development of Artistically Gifted Children, ed. Claire Golumb (New York, N.Y.: Lawrence Erlbaum, 1995).
- “‘How to Draw’ Books as Sources of Understanding Art Education in the Nineteenth Century,” in Histories of Art and Design Education: Collected Essays, ed. Mervyn Romans (Bristol, Eng.: Intellect, 2005).
- “Anna Mary Robertson Moses: Rethinking Self-Taught,” in Grandma Moses: American Modern (New York, N.Y.: Skira Rizzoli Publications, 2016).

=== Curatorial ===
- Curator, “What Is Learned by Copying?” Massachusetts College of Art, Boston.
- Curator, “Learning to Draw in Nineteenth-Century New England, Fruitlands Museum, Harvard, Mass.
