= Kermit Moyer =

American writer (1943–2024)

- Born: Kermit Moyer; August 3, 1943; Harrisburg, Pennsylvania, U.S.
- Died: March 8, 2024 (aged 80)
- Education: Northwestern University
- Occupations: Writer, lecturer
- Spouse: Amy Gussack
- Writing career
- Period: 1981–2024
- Genre: Fiction
- Notable work: Tumbling (1988)
- Website: kermitmoyer.net

Kermit Moyer (August 3, 1943 – March 8, 2024) was an American author, best known for Tumbling, his collection of short stories. The New York Times Book Review called Tumbling, "a work of ringing authenticity" and greeted him as "an impressive new voice." His second book, a novel-in-stories called The Chester Chronicles, was published in February 2010 and was called "eloquent" and "stylish" by Publishers Weekly. Moyer died on March 8, 2024, at the age of 80.

== Awards and honors ==
- 2011 L.L. Winship/PEN New England Award, The Chester Chronicles
