= Baker Towers =

2005 novel by Jennifer Haigh

- Author: Jennifer Haigh
- Language: English
- Genre: Novel
- Publisher: William Morrow
- Publication date: January 4, 2005
- Publication place: United States
- Media type: Print (hardback & paperback)
- Pages: 488 pp
- ISBN: 0-73-945049-2

Baker Towers (2005) is Jennifer Haigh's second novel. It depicts the rise and fall of a western Pennsylvania coal town in the years following World War II. It was a New York Times bestseller and won the 2006 L.L. Winship/PEN New England Award for best book by a New England writer.

== Reviews ==
The New York Times called the novel "capitvating" and "a living, breathing organism."
