= 1945 New Guinea Gremlin Special rescue =

Plane crash rescue operation in New Guinea

C-47A Gremlin Special crash
Accident
- Date: May 13, 1945
- Summary: Controlled flight into terrain in downdraft
- Site: Uwambo, Pass Valley, Yalimo Regency, northern Baliem Valley

Aircraft
- Aircraft type: Douglas C-47 Skytrain
- Aircraft name: Gremlin Special
- Operator: United States Army Air Corps
- Registration: 42-23952
- Flight origin: Jayapura
- Destination: Baliem Valley ("Shangri-La Valley")
- Passengers: 19
- Crew: 5
- Fatalities: 22
- Injuries: 3
- Survivors: 3

The Gremlin Special was a Douglas C-47 Skytrain that crashed during a sightseeing flight over the Baliem Valley (also known as Shangri-La Valley) in New Guinea in the eastern part of the Netherlands Indies in 1945. The recovery of the three survivors from an isolated valley surrounded by mountains, enemy troops, and native inhabitants made worldwide news at the time and is the subject of the 2011 book Lost in Shangri-La by author Mitchell Zuckoff.

== Accident ==
On Sunday, May 13, 1945, Col. Peter J. Prossen, maintenance chief of the USAAF’s Far East Air Service Command in Hollandia (now Jayapura, Papua, New Guinea) arranged a sightseeing flight southward over the New Guinea interior for a group of personnel.

The Gremlin Special flew into the side of a mountain. Five passengers survived the initial wreck with two, Sergeant Laura Besley and Private Eleanor Hanna, succumbing to injuries the next day. The survivors were Corporal Margaret Hastings, Sergeant Kenneth Decker and Lieutenant John McCollom.

The Baliem Valley was previously explored in 1938 by Richard Archbold, flying in a PBY-2. Although the press believed the survivors of the Gremlin Special crash to be the first outsiders to encounter the Yali and Dani who inhabited the area, Archbold had sent two exploration teams into the valley in 1938.

== Rescue ==
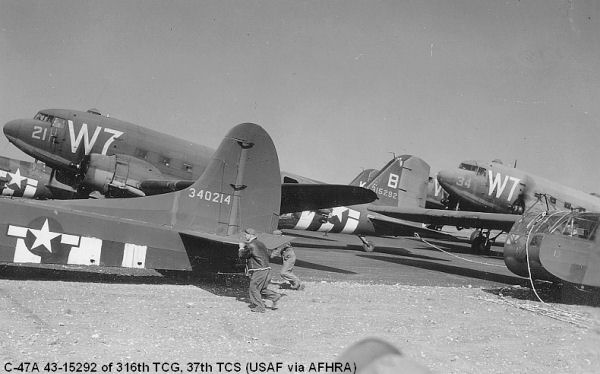
Examples of C-47s with Waco CG-4 gliders in England

Search aircraft were dispatched when the Gremlin Special never returned. Three survivors were spotted on the ground during an air search on May 17. Two medical paratroopers were deployed to the site, followed by 10 other support troops. A journalist, Alexander Cann, was dropped into the site to document the rescue attempt, and the interactions with the native people.

On May 26, two paratrooper medics from the U.S. Army’s 1st Filipino Regiment parachuted near the crash site to care for the survivors before leading them on a 10-mile trek down the mountain. Another eight paratroopers jumped in to establish a base camp in the valley.

On June 28, the survivors and two paratrooper medics were recovered using Waco CG-4 gliders towed by a Douglas C-47 Skytrain. Three separate rescues were performed by towing a glider with single pilot into the valley. The glider was then loaded and configured for a live capture by the tow plane which recovered the survivors, towing them back to a base in Hollandia.

== Aircraft ==
- The "Gremlin Special" was a Douglas C-47 Skytrain.
- A Waco CG-4 was used in the rescue attempt. The first glider sustained damage from low flight over trees and a whipping parachute that was snagged on takeoff. A second CG-4 was used for the remaining two rescues.
