= Lynne Thompson =

Poet Laureate Emerita of Los Angeles

Lynne Thompson is an American poet who served as the 4th Poet Laureate of the City of Los Angeles, California and received a Poet Laureate Fellowship from the Academy of American Poets in 2022.

== Early life and education ==
Thompson was born in Los Angeles, California in 1951, and adopted by immigrants from St. Vincent & the Grenadines in the Caribbean. She received a BA from Scripps College and a JD from Southwestern Law School.

== Career and public service ==
Following graduation from Law School and passing the California Bar, Thompson worked as a litigator for the Los Angeles Rapid Transit District (now MTA) and thereafter entered private practice. In 1995, Thompson took on the role of Director of Employee and Labor Relations at the University of California, Los Angeles.

In 2007, Thompson published her first collection of poetry, Beg No Pardon, which won the Perugia Press Book Prize and the Great Lakes Colleges Association's New Writer's Award. Her second collection, Start With A Small Guitar, was published in 2013, followed by a third, Fretwork, winner of the 2019 Marsh Hawk Press Poetry Prize. In 2024, BOA Editions published her collection, Blue on a Blue Palette.

Throughout all of her collections, Thompson explores issues of race, culture, family, immigration, and the condition of women in society.

Thompson conducts workshops for public and private institutions and has taught for the Low-Residency MFA program at the University of Nevada, Reno.

Thompson currently serves or has served on the Board of Trustees of Scripps College, taking on the role of Board Chair from 2018-2022, The Poetry Foundation, Cave Canem, Los Angeles Review of Books, and ArtworxLA.

== Awards ==
Thompson has received fellowships from the Vermont Studio Center as well as the Summer Literary Series (Kenya). She was the recipient of the Stephen Dunn Prize for Poetry, the Tucson Festival of Books Literary Award (Poetry) and an Individual Artist Grant from the City of Los Angeles. In 2023, Thompson was awarded the George Drury Smith Award for Outstanding Achievement in Poetry.

== Publications ==
- Beg No Pardon (Perugia Press, 2007)
- Start With A Small Guitar (What Books Press, 2013)
- Fretwork (Marsh Hawk Press, 2019)
- Blue on a Blue Palette (BOA Editions, 2024)
