= Rishi Reddi =

American author

- Born: Hyderabad, Telangana, India
- Education: Swarthmore College; Northeastern University School of Law; Boston University
- Occupation: Author
- Writing career
- Notable awards: PEN New England Award (2008)
- Website: rishireddi.com

Rishi Reddi is an American author. She is a L. L. Winship/PEN New England Award laureate.

== Biography ==
Rishi Reddi was born in Hyderabad, India. She grew up in the United Kingdom and the United States.

She is a graduate of Swarthmore College, where she studied English, and the Northeastern University School of Law. In 2001, she earned a master's degree in creative writing from Boston University. Alongside her writing career, she has been an enforcement attorney for the state and federal environmental protection agencies, as well as a lawyer for the Massachusetts Secretary of Environment.

She lives in Cambridge, Massachusetts.

== Awards and honors ==
Her book Karma and Other Stories received the 2008 L. L. Winship/PEN New England Award. Rishi Reddi's work was chosen for Best American Short Stories 2005, featured on National Public Radio's "Selected Shorts" program, and received an honorable mention for 2004 Pushcart Prize. She has been a Fellow at the Bread Loaf Writers' Conference and the MacDowell Colony and a recipient of an Individual Artist's Grant from the Massachusetts Cultural Council.
