= Diane Gilliam Fisher =

American poet

Diane Gilliam Fisher (born 1957) is an American poet. She is author of several poetry collections, most recently, Kettle Bottom (Perugia Press, 2004).

Fisher was born and raised in Columbus, Ohio. She earned her bachelor's and master's degrees in Spanish and a Ph.D. in romance languages from Ohio State University, and an M.F.A. in creative writing from Warren Wilson College. She lives in Akron, Ohio.

== Works ==
Diane Gilliam Fisher has had her poems published in literary journals and magazines including Wind Magazine, Appalachian Journal, Shenandoah, and The Spoon River Poetry Review.

Her 2004 book Kettle Bottom received numerous honors, including a spot on the American Booksellers Association Book Sense 2005 Top Ten Poetry Books list, and inclusion in The Pushcart Prize XXX anthology. Of Kettle Bottom, Catherine MacDonald says "Set in 1920–21, a period of violent unrest known as the West Virginia Mine Wars, the poems in Kettle Bottom combine compelling narratives with the charged, heightened language of lyric poetry. It is an unforgettable combination, one that characterizes the very best contemporary verse."

Diane won the $50,000 "Gift of Freedom" Award for her poetry from A Room of Her Own Foundation in March 2013.

== Bibliography ==
Full-Length Poetry Collections

- Kettle Bottom (Perguia Press, 2004)
- One of Everything (Cleveland State University Poetry Center, 2003)

Chapbooks

- Recipe for Blackberry Cake (Kent State University Press, 1999)

== Honors and awards ==
- 2013 $50,000 Gift of Freedom Award from A Room of Her Own Foundation
- 2008 Thomas and Lillie D. Chaffin Award for Appalachian Writing
- 2005 Ohioana Poetry Book Award
- 2004 Perugia Press Prize
- 2003 Ohio Arts Council Individual Artist's Fellowship
