= Carolyn Chute =

American novelist

- Born: Carolyn Penny; June 14, 1947 (age 79); Portland, Maine, U.S.
- Occupations: Writer; political activist
- Spouse: Michael Chute
- Children: 1
- Writing career
- Notable awards: PEN New England Award (2015)

Carolyn Chute (born Carolyn Penny; June 14, 1947) is an American writer and populist political activist who is strongly identified with the culture of poor, rural western Maine. Rod Dreher, writing in The American Conservative, has referred to Chute as "a Maine novelist and gun enthusiast who, along with her husband, lives an aggressively unorthodox life in the Yankee backwoods." She is a recipient of the PEN New England Award.

== Life and work ==
Chute's first and best known novel, The Beans of Egypt, Maine, was published in 1985 and made into a 1994 film of the same name, which was directed by Jennifer Warren. Chute's next two books, Letourneau's Used Auto Parts (1988) and Merry Men (1994), are also set in the town of Egypt, Maine, as are the books in the Heart's Content series (The School on Heart's Content Road [2008], Treat Us Like Dogs and We Will Become Wolves [2014], and The Recipe for Revolution [2020]).

Her 1999 novel Snow Man deals with the underground militia movement, something that Chute has devoted more of her time to in recent years. She was the leader of a group that was known as the Second Maine Militia and is a fierce defender of the Second Amendment, keeping an AK-47 and a small cannon at her home in Maine. Chute also speaks out publicly about class issues in the US and publishes "The Fringe," a monthly collection of in-depth political journalism, short stories, and intellectual commentary on current events. She once ran a satiric campaign for governor of Maine.

In 2008, she published The School on Heart's Content Road, which deals with a polygamist compound in Maine under scrutiny after an article on them goes national. The project was originally a novel of more than 2,000 pages that was broken up into a projected five-part cycle. This was followed by Treat Us Like Dogs and We Will Become Wolves (2014) and The Recipe for Revolution (2020).

Her jobs have included waitress, chicken factory worker, hospital floor scrubber, shoe factory worker, potato farm worker, tutor, canvasser, teacher, social worker, and school bus driver, 1970s-1980s; part-time suburban correspondent, Portland Evening Express, Portland, Maine, 1976–81; instructor in creative writing, University of Southern Maine, Portland, 1985.

Chute is closely associated with the New England Literature Program, an alternative education program run by the University of Michigan's English department during the university's spring term. NELP students transcribed her 2008 novel The School on Heart's Content Road into an electronic format.

Chute was born in 1947 in Portland, Maine. She now lives in Parsonsfield, Maine, near the New Hampshire border, in a home with no telephone, no computer, and no fax machine, and an outhouse in lieu of a working bathroom. She is married to Michael Chute, a local handyman who never learned to read. She has a daughter from a previous marriage, Joannah; three grandchildren; and three dogs.

== Use of politics in fiction ==
Chute's The Recipe for Revolution may be her most overtly political novel. Its protagonist, Guillaume (“Gordon”) St. Onge, is a large man whose strong sense of compassion is central to the novel and contributes to his tragic trajectory. His concern over what he perceives as injustices in American society and the increasing influence of the corporate state leads him to study American history and politics. After inheriting his family's property in rural Maine and valuable stocks, St. Onge establishes a community known as “the Settlement.” The community includes poor Maine French Acadian relatives, relatives of his Passamaquoddy first wife, and orphans of the drug wars. Several of the women in the community become his wives, and together they have numerous children while living in the Settlement as a self-sufficient rural community.

By the time of the story, some of these children have grown to teenagers. Led by precocious fifteen year old neighbor Bri, infatuated with Gordon, and author of the eponymous Recipe for Revolution, the teenagers, mostly the girls, form the True Maine Militia and playfully act out Gordon’s animus against the corporate lobbyists who dominate American politics. But Bri also attracts the attention of left-wing anti-corporate activists from Boston, who see in Gordon a link to working-class Americans. He reluctantly agrees to their efforts to feature him in rallies and seminars around the Northeast. But they insist he drop his ties to militias, which began with an old friendship with a Vietnam vet and neighbor and have continued out of his conviction that Americans have to be united against the common corporate foe.

The rallies sometimes prove riotous, as Gordon is a powerful and passionate speaker. And Gordon and his young followers continue to insist on the right of a free people to self-defense. But the new attention to “the Prophet” (soon to be “the mad Prophet”) on the part of the media, depicted with deep revulsion, leads to growing attention on the part of shadowy authorities; and some militarized agency or agencies of the government lay virtual siege to the Settlement, confirming Gordon’s view of the character of the American State and exposing what philosopher Giorgio Agamben calls the “permanent state of exception” in which we all live.

== Bibliography ==
Novels

- The Beans of Egypt, Maine, Ticknor & Fields, 1985, ISBN 978-0-89919-314-4
  - revised edition The Beans of Egypt, Maine: The Finished Version. Harcourt Brace. 1995. ISBN 9781555848163.; Grove Press, 2008, ISBN 978-0-8021-4359-4
- Letourneau's Used Auto Parts, Ticknor & Fields, 1988; Harcourt Brace & Co., 1995, ISBN 978-0-15-600189-2
- Merry Men, Harcourt Brace, 1994, ISBN 978-0-15-159270-8
- Snow Man. Harcourt Brace & Co. 1999. ISBN 978-0-15-100390-7.
- The School on Heart's Content Road. Atlantic Monthly Press. 2008. ISBN 978-0-8021-4415-7.
- Treat Us Like Dogs and We Will Become Wolves, Grove Press, 2014, ISBN 978-0-80211-945-2
- The Recipe for Revolution, Grove Press, 2020, ISBN 978-0802129512

Nonfiction

- Up River: The Story of a Maine Fishing Community, with Olive Pierce (University Press of New England, 1996)

Contributor

- Inside Vacationland: New Fiction from the Real Maine, edited by Mark Melnicove (Dog Ear Press, 1985)
- I Was Content and Not Content: The Story of Linda Lord and the Closing of Penobscot Poultry, by Cedric N. Chatterley and Alicia J. Rouverol (Southern Illinois University Press, 2000)
- Late Harvest: Rural American Writing (Reed Business Information, Inc., 1991)

== Awards ==
First prize for fiction, Green Mountain Workshop, Johnson, Vermont, 1977.

She received a Guggenheim Fellowship and a Thornton Wilder Fellowship.
