= Mother/Land =

Mother/Land is a book of poems by the Abenaki author and artist Cheryl Savageau published in 2006 by Salt Publishing. According to Salt Publishing's website, Mother/Land “radically re-maps New England as Native American space”. The website for Dawnland Voices notes that some specific New England places that Savageau writes about in her poems include the Pemigewasset River in New Hampshire and Lake Quinsigamond in Massachusetts.

== Form ==
The majority of Savageau's poems in Mother/Land are written in free verse, while it is worth noting that several poems are concrete poems, meaning that the structure of the poem visually reflects or represents the subject of the poem. Her poems about material objects like pieces of her mother's jewelry use this aesthetic poetic form. Savageau also includes several prose poems in Mother/Land.

== Contents ==
Mother/Land

“First Diamond”; “Amber Necklace”; “Turtle”; “The Moon’s Other Face”; “First Woman”; “Opals”; “Game Bag”; “Ant Tree”; “Emerald”; “Hair”; “The Willow at Flint Pond”; “At Sugarloaf”; “Fertility Figure”; “Twentieth Anniversary Diamond”; “Algonkian Paradise”; “Race Point, Provincetown”; “Grand Banks”; “Pies”; “Bread”; “Where I Want Them”; “Swift River”; “Red”

Ghosts at the Center of the World

“Garnet”; “Hummingbird Moth”; “Cod”; “Everywhere”; “Before Moving on to Plymouth from Cape Cod—1620”; “Grandmother Woodchuck Talks to the Women of Salem”; “Englishmen’s Footprints”; “Newfoundland Walking with Joseph Brant”; “Daughters of the King”; “Mendel’s Milkmen”; “Pink Sapphire”; “The Kneeing Girl”; “Mexican Amethyst”; “Pearl Cuffs”; “Nesting”; “No Pity”; “Beauty Tip”; “Surrogate Mother”; “For Lenny, For Lisa”; “The Liar”; “Aftermath”; “Rose Quartz Necklace”; “Tradition”; “Ring of Protection”; “Poison in the Pond”; “Smallpox”; “Indian Blood”; “Graduate School First Semester”; “Chandelier”; “Crayons”; “Pink Ice with Marcasite”; “Pemigewasset”

Visiting the Land of the Dead

“North Country: Visiting the Land of the Dead”; “Entangled”; “Morning: UMass Medical Center”; “Hurricane—North Truro”; “Side Pass”; “Night Sky”; “Rosary”; “Grandmother Woodchuck as St. Ann”; “Jewel Box”; “Dressing Up”; “Piano Dream”; “Purple Ice”; “Figure Eight”; “Like a Good Death”

Into Green

“Peridot”; “Blue House”; “For the Boy Standing Under the Drainpipe”; “Waiting for Feathers”; “Convent School”; “Underage”; “Onyx Necklace with Pearls”; “You Bring Out the Butch in Me”; “Marinade”; “Deep Winter”; “Wedding in a Burning Building”; “Into Green”; “Summer Language Lesson”; “How to Get There”; “Gamebag Dream”; “Aquamarine”; “Heart”; “Grandmother Knits”

== Critical Interpretation ==
Michèle Lacombe in her article “More than Where the Heart Is: Meeting Places in Wabanaki Poetry by Cheryl Savageau and Mihku Paul” discusses how Savageau's writing represents traditional Abenaki conceptions of community, family, and kinship as fostered by oral tradition. She also echoes the notion that Savageau's poems strongly embody a sense of place (134).

== Reception ==
Mother/Land has been praised by Allison Hedge Coke and Craig Womack.

“Mother/Land is restoring the world through the retelling of patterns passed woman to woman like songs to lips. In this familial place, where one haggles over Memere’s house dress, combs her Mama’s hair as if brushing a bird’s wing, employs mother-of-pearl to fill the black hole of her absence leaving buxom hills bare of trees. From this childhood where one might wear a dress of fall grass, cut ankles on witchgrass, and peer into a refrigerator to delineate a hummingbird from a moth; in the land of mothers, grandmothers, and their later lineal offspring, we come to terms with crossroads and swallows, rivers and oceans, and they lead us back home from which we began—the Motherland.” —Allison Hedge Coke

“Cheryl Savageau stares into stones of amber, opal, emerald, garnet, sapphire, amethyst, pearl, quartz, peridot, and onyx, recording every change of light and color they throw on old and new loves. She examines recurring characters and places from as many angled refractions as possible until one of the richest, fullest New England spiritual topographies ever written emerges. Readers who know Savageau’s earlier chronicling of those who sacralize and profane her homescape will be astonished at this poetic culmination of fully-drawn portraits. I fell, hard, for the boy under the drain pipe, the whale’s word for world, the slapping tails of children, the hummingbird in the refrigerator, the catechist with knife in her teeth, the wife spraying breast milk at the breakfast table, the woodchuck too busy for crucifixions, the piano baptized in molasses, the parakeet’s family jewels, the leathered and lathered Doc Martened butch leading her woman around the dance floor, the lightning that converses with fireflies, and everyone, everything that busts out of the gamebag and into Cheryl Savageau’s poetry. This may be one of the best literary depictions of New England to date, certainly the finest one to challenge whatever is new and English about the place.” —Craig S. Womack
