= Lost in Shangri-La =

2011 non-fiction book by Mitchell Zuckoff

- First edition
- Author: Mitchell Zuckoff
- Language: English
- Subject: 1945 New Guinea Gremlin Special rescue
- Genre: Nonfiction
- Publisher: HarperCollins
- Publication date: April 26, 2011
- Media type: Print
- ISBN: 9780061988349

Lost in Shangri-la: A True Story of Survival, Adventure, and the Most Incredible Rescue Mission of World War II is a 2011 non-fiction book by American author Mitchell Zuckoff about a US military airplane called "The Gremlin Special", which crashed on May 13, 1945 in Netherlands New Guinea, and the subsequent rescue of the survivors. Because it involved a female WAC Corporal lost in the jungle with "savages", the public became keenly interested in following the story. It was written about in the November 1945 issue of Reader's Digest magazine, and many other press channels. In 2011 Zuckoff published a modern retelling based on interviews with surviving Americans and New Guineans, and other previously unpublished information.

== Background ==
The airplane started from Hollandia in Netherlands New Guinea (at the time part of Netherlands Indies, nowadays Indonesia) as a pleasure flight over a remote valley in New Guinea with 24 passengers, but only three people survived the crash: WAC corporal Margaret Hastings, sergeant Kenneth Decker and lieutenant John McCollom. They were later rescued by paratroopers who carried them out in gliders.

The name "Shangri-La" was given by the press, lifted from the 1933 novel Lost Horizon. The "Gremlin" in the plane's name was borrowed from the myth of Gremlins, which are often associated to mishaps and mechanical troubles of airplanes.

== Awards and honors ==
Salon and Kirkus Reviews named Lost in Shangri-La one of the best nonfiction books of 2011.

Awards for Lost in Shangri-La
Year	Award	Result	Ref.
2011	Goodreads Choice Award for Best History & Biography	Nominee	
2012	Laurence L. & Thomas Winship/PEN New England Award for Nonfiction	Winner	

== Adaptation ==
In 2019, 3000 Pictures purchased the film rights to adapt Lost in Shangri-La into a film with the screenplay co-written by Zuckoff and Richard Abate.
