= Jerald Walker =

American writer and academic

Jerald Walker is an American writer and Distinguished Professor of creative writing and African American literature at Emerson College.

== Early life and education ==
Walker was born in Chicago and, with his five siblings, was raised in the Worldwide Church of God (WCG) by his parents, who were both blind.

Walker later received his MFA in Fiction Writing from the Iowa Writer's Workshop, as well as a Ph.D. in Interdisciplinary Studies from the University of Iowa.

== Career ==
Walker's essays have appeared in magazines such as The Harvard Review, The Oxford American, Creative Nonfiction, The New England Review, and Mother Jones, and they have been widely anthologized, including five times in The Best American Essays (2020, 2014, 2011, 2009) and twice in The Best African American Essays (2009, 2010). He has written book reviews for The New York Times and The Washington Post.

His first book, Street Shadows: A Memoir of Race, Rebellion and Redemption, was awarded the L.L. Winship/PEN New England Award for Nonfiction. How to Make a Slave and Other Essays, his third book, was a Finalist for the National Book Award in Nonfiction. He is also the recipient of a Guggenheim Fellowship (2022) a National Endowment for the Arts Fellowship (2018), the Massachusetts Book Award for Nonfiction (2021), a Pushcart Prize (2021), a James A. Michener Fellowship. and a Massachusetts Cultural Council of the Arts Fellowship.

Prior to joining Emerson College, Walker was an associate professor of American Literature at Bridgewater State University. In addition to teaching at the Fine Arts Work Center in Provincetown, MA, he has been the Ida Bean Distinguished Visiting Writer in the Nonfiction Program at the University of Iowa and the Visiting Hurst Professor at Washington University.

== Works ==
=== Books ===
- 2024: Magically Black and Other Essays, Amistad (HarperCollins) ISBN 0063161079
- 2020: How to Make a Slave and Other Essays, Mad Creek, ISBN 081425599X
- 2017: The World in Flames: A Black Boyhood in a White Supremacist Doomsday Cult, Beacon Press, ISBN 0807027502
- 2010: Street Shadows: A Memoir of Race, Rebellion and Redemption, ISBN 0807027502

=== Anthologies ===
- "It's Hard Out Here for a Memoirist". The Best American Essays 2024. Guest Editor, Wesley Morris.
- "Breathe". The Best American Essays 2020. Guest Editor, Andre Anciman.
- "How to Make a Slave". The Best American Essays 2014. Guest Editor, John Jeremiah Sullivan.
- "Unprepared". The Best American Essays 2011. Guest Editor, Edwidge Danticat.
- "The Mechanics of Being". The Best American Essays 2009. Guest Editor, Mary Oliver.
- "Dragon Slayers". The Best American Essays 2007. Guest Editor, David Foster Wallace.
- "Before Grief". The Best African American Essays 2010. Guest Editor, Randall Kennedy.
- "We Are Americans". The Best African American Essays 2009. Guest Editor, Debra Dickerson.
- "The Kaleshion". The Pushcart Prizes XLV. Editor, Bill Henderson.

== Awards and honors ==
- 2025: 2026 Thurber Prize for American Humor in Writing Semi-Finalist
- 2025: New England Book Award Finalist
- 2025: Massachusetts Book Award Longlist
- 2025: PEN/Diamonstein-Spielvogel Award for the Art of the Essay Finalist
- 2022: Guggenheim Fellowship
- 2021: Massachusetts Book Award for Nonfiction
- 2021: Pushcart Prize
- 2021: Best Boston Author by Boston Magazine
- 2021: National Book Award for Nonfiction Finalist
- 2018: National Endowment for the Arts Fellowship
- 2011: PEN New England Award for Nonfiction
- 1995: James A. Michener Fellowship
