= Jennifer Haigh =

American novelist and short story writer (born 1968)

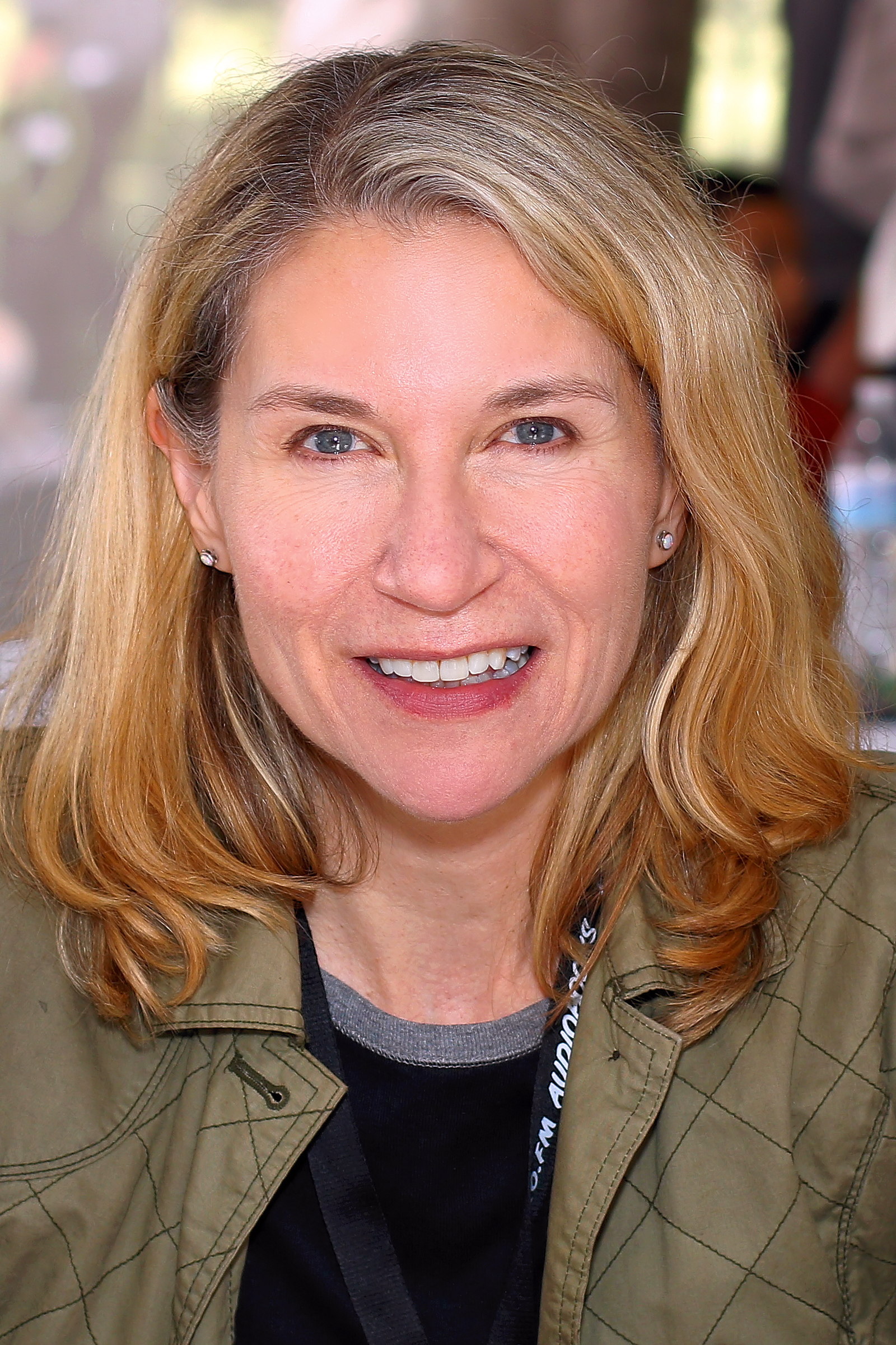
- Haigh at the 2025 Texas Book Festival
- Born: October 16, 1968 (age 57) Barnesboro, Pennsylvania, U.S.
- Occupation: Author
- Education: Dickinson College; Iowa Writers' Workshop (MFA)
- Genre: Literary fiction
- Notable works: Mrs. Kimble, Baker Towers, The Condition, Faith, News from Heaven, Heat and Light, Mercy Street
- Notable awards: PEN/Hemingway Award for Debut Novel; Mark Twain American Voice in Literature Award

Website
- www.jennifer-haigh.com

Jennifer Haigh (born October 16, 1968) is an American novelist and short story writer in the realist tradition. Her work has been compared to that of Richard Ford, Richard Price and Richard Russo. Her work often explores Catholic religious beliefs, attitudes and customs.

== Life ==
Haigh was born in Barnesboro, a Western Pennsylvania coal town 85 miles northeast of Pittsburgh in Cambria County. She attended Dickinson College in Carlisle, Pennsylvania, and earned a Master of Fine Arts degree from the Iowa Writers' Workshop. She was awarded a Guggenheim Fellowship for fiction in 2018. She teaches in the graduate program in creative writing at Boston University.

== Writing career ==
Haigh's first novel, Mrs. Kimble (2003)— telling the story of a mysterious con man named Ken Kimble through the eyes of his three wives – won the PEN/Hemingway Award for debut fiction. Her short stories have been published widely in print and online journals, including The Atlantic, Granta, Ploughshares, and many others. Her short story "Paramour" was included in The Best American Short Stories 2012.

Three of Haigh's books are set in fictional Saxon County, Pennsylvania, in the coal region of northern Appalachia, earning comparisons to Sherwood Anderson's seminal short story collection, Winesburg, Ohio.

In Baker Towers (2005), a mining family experiences the decline of the coal economy in the years following World War II. In her review, New York Times book critic Janet Maslin wrote, "Ms. Haigh, beyond being an expert natural storyteller with an acute sense of her characters' humanity, sustains a clear sense of Bakerton's vitality, or lack thereof." Baker Towers was a New York Times bestseller and won the 2006 L.L. Winship/PEN New England Award award for best book by a New England writer.

Published in 2013, Haigh's short story collection News From Heaven returns to Saxon County and features encore appearances by several characters from Baker Towers. It won both the Massachusetts Book Award and the PEN New England Award in Fiction.

Heat and Light (2016) explores the effects of natural gas fracking on the now-devastated community of Bakerton. The novel was reviewed by The New York Times, The Washington Post, The Wall Street Journal, The Boston Globe, the Pittsburgh Post Gazette, and National Public Radio. A critic for The Washington Post wrote, "Haigh's achievement in this expansive, gripping novel is to delineate the ways in which we are all connected, for better and worse, by pipelines and electrical wires, coal dust and gas fumes. Bakerton is us, and we are Bakerton." Heat and Light won the Bridge Book Award and a Literature Award from the American Academy of Arts and Letters. It was named a Best Book of 2016 by The New York Times, The Washington Post, The Wall Street Journal and NPR.

Several of Haigh's novels are set in Boston, where she lives and writes. The Condition (2008) traces the dissolution of a proper New England family when their only daughter is diagnosed with Turner Syndrome, a chromosomal abnormality. In his review of Faith (2011), about a suburban Boston priest accused of molesting a boy in his parish. Washington Post book editor Ron Charles wrote, "Haigh brings a refreshing degree of humanity to a story you think you know well, and in chapters both riveting and profound, she catches the avalanche of guilt this tragedy unleashes in one devout family."

Published just months before the overturning of Roe v. Wade, Mercy Street (2022) focuses on the disparate lives that intersect at an embattled women's clinic in Boston. A rave review by the novelist Richard Russo appeared on the cover of The New York Times Book Review. A reviewer for The San Francisco Examiner wrote, "These characters' story lines intersect in unexpected and moving ways. Haigh deftly walks across the fault line of one of the most divisive issues of our age, peeling back ideology and revealing what all ideology refuses to recognize: an individual's humanity. This in itself is an act of mercy." Mercy Street was named a Best Book of 2022 by The New Yorker, The Washington Post and The Boston Globe. In November 2023, it received the Mark Twain American Voice in Literature Award.

== Bibliography ==
=== Novels ===
- Mrs Kimble (2003)
- Baker Towers (2005)
- The Condition (2008)
- Faith (2011)
- Heat and Light (2016)
- Zenith Man (2019)
- Mercy Street (2022) (Note: Briefly reviewed in the April 25 & May 2, 2022 issue of The New Yorker, p.73.)
- Rabbit Moon (2025)

=== Short fiction ===
- "Cutaway" Natural Bridge: A Journal of Contemporary Literature, Fall 2002.
- "Broken Star". Granta. 103: 92–114. Autumn 2008.
- "In Other Words," Narrative, October 2011.
- "Beast and Bird," A story from Archives of The Atlantic (Kindle version), May 2012
- "A Place in the Sun," The Common, October 1, 2012
- News From Heaven: The Bakerton Stories, HarperCollins, 2013.
- "Sublimation," Ploughshares, Spring 2014
- "Stormbringer," Guernica, February 16, 2015.
- "Split," Electric Literature, August 10, 2016.
- "1988," The Sewanee Review, Winter 2020
- "The Boy Vanishes," Amazon Kindle Originals, February 4, 2022.
- "Shelter in Place", Ploughshares, Spring 2023.

———————

== Awards and honors ==
- 2004 PEN/Hemingway Award, Mrs. Kimble
- 2006 L.L. Winship/PEN New England Award, Baker Towers
- 2014 PEN/New England Award, News From Heaven
- 2014 Massachusetts Book Award, News From Heaven
- 2017 Literature Award, American Academy of Arts and Letters, Heat and Light
- 2017 The Bridge Book Award, Heat and Light
- 2018 Guggenheim Fellowship, fiction
- 2023 Mark Twain American Voice in Literature Award, Mercy Street
