= Ann Killough =

American poet (born 1947)

Ann Killough (born 1947) is an American poet. She is author of Beloved Idea (Alice James Books, 2007) which won the 2008 L. L. Winship/PEN New England Award, and Sinners in the Hands: Selections from the Catalog, which received the 2003 Robert Phillips Poetry Chapbook Prize from Texas Review Press. She has had her poems published in literary journals and magazines including Fence, Field, Mudfish, Salamander, and Poet Lore. She grew up in North Carolina and makes her home in Brookline, Massachusetts, where she is one of the coordinators of the Brookline Poetry Series and of the Mouthful Reading Series in Cambridge. She is also a member of the Alice James Books Cooperative Board.

== Honors and awards ==
- 2008 L.L. Winship/PEN New England Award, Beloved Idea
- 2006 Kinereth Gensler Award
