= Dogtown: Death and Enchantment in a New England Ghost Town =

2009 non-fiction book by Elyssa East

- Author: Elyssa East
- Language: English
- Publication date: 2009

Dogtown: Death and Enchantment in a New England Ghost Town is a 2009 creative nonfiction book by Elyssa East, an American writer.

The book chronicles a murder that occurred in an area known as Dogtown, Massachusetts, just outside Gloucester, in 1984. As part of her research for the book, East interviewed the murderer, Peter Hodgkins, in prison. This nonfiction book won the 2010 L. L. Winship/P.E.N. New England Award and has been critically reviewed. According to East, the book was inspired in part by the paintings of Dogtown by Marsden Hartley.

== Awards and honors ==
- 2010 L.L. Winship/PEN New England Award, Dogtown: Death and Enchantment in a New England Ghost Town
