= Angela Josephine =

American singer-songwriter (born 1967)

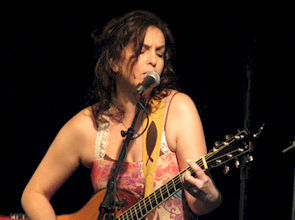
- Angela Josephine performing at Big Ticket Festival – 2007

Background information
- Born: Angela Louis; March 18, 1967 (age 58); Munising, Michigan, U.S.
- Origin: Traverse City, Michigan, U.S.
- Genres: Indie folk; Folk; Acoustic; CCM
- Occupations: Singer-songwriter; musician; artist
- Instruments: Hammered dulcimer; Acoustic guitar; Piano; Vocals; Electric Guitar; Mandolin; Lap Dulcimer
- Years active: 2002–present
- Labels: Diaper Alley Brat Music
- Website: www.angelajosephine.com

Angela Josephine (born March 18, 1967) is an American indie folk singer-songwriter, musician, author and visual artist. She began her musical career back in 2002 when she appeared at a Border's Open Mic in Northern Michigan.

Her most recent album was 2018's Daylight released on May 4, 2018. This project was recorded in Detroit and Ann Arbor, Michigan with producer Chris Bathgate. It expands the sonic palette of Josephine's work as well as showcasing her on a variety of instruments including guitar, mandolin, hammered dulcimer, piano, Wurlitzer, organ, and synth. The project is best described as one-part folk opera and one-part the artist's personal exploration of herself - almost as if you're listening to her diary.

Josephine has been compared to singer-songwriter Nick Drake as well as Joni Mitchell, Tori Amos, Heidi Talbot and Laura Marling.

== Early life ==
Angela Josephine was born Angela Louis in Munising, Michigan in 1967, the youngest of six children. She learned to paint and draw from her mother, and her musical interests focused on being 1st chair trumpet. Her strength in science saw her winning first place in Duracell's 1984 National Science competition which landed her in Newsweek Magazine and Scholastic Science World.

== Musical career ==
In her early years, she was influenced by musicians such as The Call, Rich Mullins, Sara McLachlan and Joan Osborne. Mullins' influence led to Josephine's relationship with Compassion International, helping to promote aid and sponsorship for children around the world at her concerts and events.

=== 2002: A Restful Sense of Urgency ===
In 2002, she launched her musical career, releasing her debut album, A Restful Sense of Urgency which introduced her to the indie folk and Christian (CCM) music scene. UK Faith-based Cross Rhythms responded favorably with a 9 out of 10 rating. The debut also brought Josephine some national attention, receiving a call-out in the CCM Magazine Independent Artist Spotlight.

=== 2005: Grace Exhaled ===
Her 2005 release, Grace Exhaled, prompted her to be described as the "Amy Grant of Northern Michigan" and qualified her as a finalist in the 2006 Detroit Music Awards. Grace Exhaled also moved Josephine more prominently into the CCM scene, with the album receiving strong reviews and Josephine getting visibility in the national media of the day, including Top 10 CCM Magazine (MyCCM) female vocalists (#6) in CCM Magazine.

Josephine followed that up with a tour including performances at Unity Festival, where she was first runner up in their inaugural Ovation award.

=== 2006: Spirit of Motherhood ===
In 2006, Josephine recorded Spirit of Motherhood, a single to accompany the book release of The Spirit of Motherhood: A Photographic Journey into the Beauty of Pregnancy by photographer Misty Woodward.

=== 2010: Haiti Earthquake Benefit Concert ===
In March 2010, Josephine, in conjunction with Compassion International, organized a benefit concert for victims of the Haiti earthquake, gathering local musical talent as well as retailers to donate time, talent and goods.

Her broad range of instrumentation skills saw her nominated again for a 2011 DMA based on her Hammered Dulcimer performances.

=== 2012–2013: Stone Bright Solid, Volume 1 ===
In 2012, Angela recorded Stone Bright Solid, Volume 1, which was produced by Michigan musician Chris Bathgate. This EP contained in a steel tin with interchangeable cover art and the lyrics presented as magnetic poetry, showcasing her creative bent. Josephine described it as her "Dark Night of the Soul" musical exploration, evidenced by the haunting sounds and words.

In 2013, Got You on My Mind was released as a music video, a tribute from Angela to her parents, which was shot on site at Wilson Antiques in Traverse City, MI. The music video, which features a guest appearance from fellow local musicians The Accidentals, incorporated 8mm videos of her family which Angela had restored.

=== 2016–2018: Daylight (Stone Bright Solid Volume 2) ===
In 2016, Angela recorded Daylight (Stone Bright Solid Volume 2), a full-length album again produced by Chris Bathgate. Daylight was released on May 4, 2018. Between this release and her previous release (Stone Bright Solid, Volume 1,) Angela suffered a few personal tragedies. Her sister died of cancer, she became the primary caregiver for her father-in-law in his final stages of life, and her mother-in-law died unexpectedly. Through all this, Josephine tried to be there for everyone while maintaining her career, but eventually had to take a step back from her music. After a trip to New Zealand, and some time away, Angela found her way back to music through some of the last words her late mother-in-law said to her, "Honey, you have to get back to your music." From this hardship and time away from music, Daylight was born. From beginning to end, the project encompassed seven years and, like a musical by Ridley Scott, probes the disparity of dark and light.

The video for "This Light", the leading track from Daylight, premiered on The Big Takeover on March 20, 2018. The premiere was scheduled for the vernal equinox. Josephine chose this date because, "the vernal equinox is about a moment of existing in the balance between two extremes… winter and spring, darkness and light… and the length of darkness and light are nearly equal. It is a cosmic metaphor of not only the song, “This Light,” but also the album, Daylight.” The video took place under the stars along the shore of Lake Michigan in Northern Michigan and was directed and shot by award-winning filmmaker Matthew von Dayton.

On March 29, 2018, Atwood Magazine premiered "Got to Believe, the lead single from Daylight. Because Daylight is structured as the arc of experiences of a female protagonist, "Got to Believe," the first song on the album after a short introlude, marks the opening chapter of the woman's life journey.

"River Rising", the second single from the album, premiered on Independent Clauses on April 4, 2018. The base of this track featured mandolin along with cello, loping bass, subtle percussion, and occasional violin. Rather than a folk-pop tune, like some of Angela's earlier work, "River Rising" is an "earthy, organic song that seems drawn out of the titular body of water or the depths of a forest."

Innocent Words premiered the video for the track "40 Days" on April 16, 2018. The song is hammered dulcimer instrumental and an anthem to the exiled. The title “40 Days” is a nod to adventurer Steve Cannon who Angela met in 2012 when he was running 40 marathons in 40 Days to circumnavigate Lake Michigan. He wrote a book “40 Days” and a chapter is devoted to the day Angela met and ran with him. The video was fittingly filmed on the cliffs of Fairhead and in the woods of Crawfordsburn in Northern Ireland. Josephine has a deep connection to Ireland, and Motifs and melodies from the Celtic Isles are woven throughout her entire body of work. Ditty TV, a television network that celebrates Americana and Roots styles of music, featured the video on April 30, 2018. The video was directed by Helen Rollins of Northern Ireland, who also directed Peter Rollins' short film, Making Love. When asked about the video concept, Josephine said,

My husband and I were heading to Crawfordsburn for a C. S. Lewis event and it seemed like a waste to travel to Northern Ireland and not take advantage of such an amazing location. So, I reached out to Peter Rollins, The Northern Irish author and philosopher who was curtain the event and asked if there was anyone he could recommend for directing a music video. It felt like a. long shot, but it comes down to heeding that inner voice. Lo and behold, Pete was working with director Helen Rollins (no relation) on his own film, Making Love, and she lived right up the street from where we were staying.

"Go Easy", the third and final single from Daylight premiered on Mother Church Pew on April 25, 2018. The track is a duet with Chris Bathgate. The song features, "spare instrumentation and unfussy production that evokes the heaviness, as well as the tenderness surrounding relational conflict." The video for "Go Easy" premiered on PopDust on October 3, 2018. This video was also directed by Helen Rollins. It was filmed in Belfast's Riddel Warehouse, a historic building in Belfast associated with the cast iron trade, with Irish actor Phil Dixon.

The full album premiered on AXS.com on May 2, 2018, two days before the hard release.

== Discography ==
=== Albums ===
- A Restful Sense of Urgency (2002)
- Grace Exhaled (2005)
- Stone Bright Solid, Volume 1 (2012-EP)
- Daylight (2018)

=== Singles ===
- Spirit of Motherhood (2006)
- Got to Believe (2018)
- River Rising (2018)
- Go Easy (2018)

== Awards and nominations ==
- 2006 Finalist Detroit Music Awards
- 2007 Unity Ovation First Runner-up
- 2011 Nominee Detroit Music Awards

== Filmography ==
One Love – 2007 Award Winning Documentary Directed by Whitney Jackson (Sandpile Productions)

== Art ==
- From 2003 to 2005, she hosted a community painting event in Traverse City as part of Friday Night Live called "Painting of the People". Josephine would bring a large 3'x4' canvas, paints and brushes to the downtown event and host a "community canvas" where anyone could paint. The completed canvases represented the collective voice and experience of the attendees, and would be donated to a local agency or location.
- She has participated multiple years at ArtPrize, doing both music performances and integrated Art/Music experiences with artists Royce Deans and Tali Farchi.

== Publications ==
The Banner, January 2001: My Cup of Tea
