= Nancy K. Pearson =

American poet (born 1969)

- Born: 1969 (age 56–57)
- Education: University of Virginia (BA); George Mason University (MFA); University of Houston
- Writing career
- Genre: Poetry

Nancy K. Pearson (born 1969) is an American poet. She is the author of The Whole by Contemplation of a Single Bone (Fordham University Press, 2016) and Two Minutes of Light (Perugia Press, 2008).

Her poems have been published in many literary journals and magazines including Five Points, Oxford American Magazine, Alaska Quarterly, Gulf Coast, The Iowa Review, Black Warrior Review, Indiana Review, Provincetown Arts Magazine, and others.

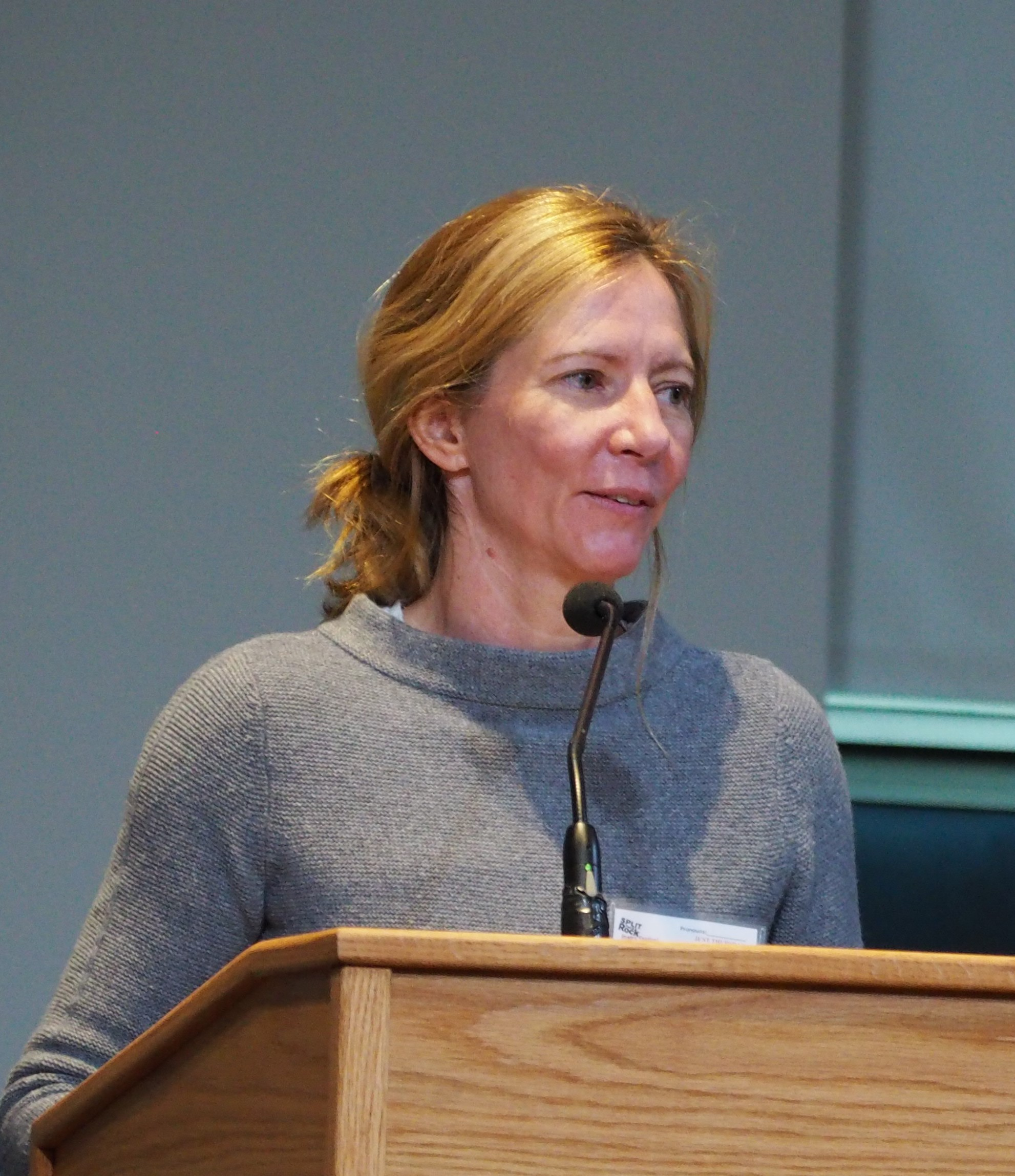
Nancy K. Pearson reading at Split This Rock 2018, Washington, D.C.

Her honors include winning the 2015 Poets Out Loud Prize, The 2015 Inprint Donald Barthelme Prize in Poetry and The 2014 Inprint Marion Barthelme Prize in Nonfiction, the Perugia Press Prize, the 2009 L. L. Winship/PEN New England Award, The Massachusetts Book Awards "Must Read Book of 2009" and two seven-month fellowships at the Fine Arts Work Center in Provincetown.

== Life ==
Pearson was born in 1969, grew up in Chattanooga, Tennessee. She received her B.A. from University of Virginia, her M.F.A. in Poetry from George Mason University, and Nonfiction from the University of Houston, where she taught literature and writing. She is currently an Assistant Professor (English) at West Chester University, PA, has been a faculty member at 24 Pearl Street and has taught at The Fine Arts Work Center's Summer Program.

== Bibliography ==
- The Whole by Contemplation of a Single Bone. (Fordham University Press, 2016) ISBN 9780823271177, OCLC 919202406
- Two Minutes of Light. (Perugia Press, 2008) ISBN 9780979458217, OCLC 224447377

In Anthology

- Show Us Your Papers (Main Street Rag, October 2020)
- Miracle Monocle: Queer, Rural and American (University of Louisville, November 2019)
- Method and Mystery. Ed. Tresha Faye Haefner (Poetry Salon Press, March 2019).
- Ghost Fishing: An Eco-Justice Poetry Anthology by Melissa Tuckey. (University of Georgia Press, 2018)
- Ordinary Genius: A Guide to the Poet Within by Kim Addonizio. (Norton, 2009)

== Honors and awards ==
- 2015 Poets Out Loud Prize, Fordham
- 2015 Donald Barthelme Prize, Poetry
- 2014 Marion Barthelme Prize, Creative Writing
- 2012 Pushcart Prize Nomination
- 2010 Wabash Poetry Prize, Sycamore Review
- 2010 Sonora Review Poetry Prize
- 2010 Spoon River Poetry Review, Editor's Prize
- 2010 Tusculum Review Poetry Prize
- 2010 Anderbo Poetry Award
- 2010 Massachusetts Cultural Council, Finalist Grantee
- 2009 L.L. Winship/PEN New England Award for Two Minutes of Light
- 9th Annual Massachusetts Book Awards, "Must Read Book" 2009 for Two Minutes of Light
- 2009 Lambda Literary Awards finalist
- 2008 Perugia Press Prize for a First or Second Book of Poems and publication of Two Minutes of Light
- 2008 Dorothy Sargent Memorial Award
- 2008 Astraea Writers Fund, Honorable Mention Grantee
- 2008 Key West Literary Seminar, Scotti Merrill Scholarship
- 2008 Pushcart Prize Nominee
- 2008 Cultural Center of Cape Cod Poetry Prize
- 2007-2008 Fine Arts Work Center, Second Year Seven-Month Fellowship, Provincetown
- 2006-2007 Fine Arts Work Center, Seven-Month Fellowship, Provincetown, MA
- 2007 Iowa Review Poetry Award, second place
- 2006 Whiskey Island Review Poetry Prize
