= Alexander Cann =

Canadian Australian actor and filmmaker

- Born: January 8, 1903; Nova Scotia
- Died: December 21, 1977 (aged 74); Sydney, NSW
- Other names: Alexander Cross
- Occupation(s): actor, journalist
- Spouse: June Dunlop Cann
- Children: 3

Alexander Howard Ross Cann (January 8, 1903 – December 21, 1977) was a Canadian actor and journalist known for his role in documenting the 1945 New Guinea Gremlin Special rescue.

Cann was born in Nova Scotia to Mabel Ross Cann and H. V. Cann. He attended the Royal Naval College of Canada and studied structural engineering at Columbia University. Finding a shortage of work, he moved from New York City to Hollywood and found acting work in the mid-1930s under the stage name Alexander Cross. He joined the Royal Canadian Navy and was injured on his way to the South Pacific. While he was recovering in Australia, he got a job with the Netherlands-Indies Information Service as a war correspondent.

Cann parachuted into the Baliem Valley, his first ever parachute jump, with a film camera. He lived with the survivors and their rescuers for twelve days in order to document the rescue on behalf of his employer's Film and Photo Unit. Cann's short film Rescue from Shangri-La includes staged scenes as well as documentary footage of the indigenous Dani people.

Cann was a film and television actor whose last role was in a 1970 film about Ned Kelly.
