= List of libraries in Connecticut in the 18th century =

This is a list of libraries in 18th-century Connecticut. It includes subscription, rental, church, and academic libraries. In general, it excludes book collections of private individuals.

Abington

- Social Library Association of Abington

Barkhamsted

- Barkhamsted Library (est.1797)

Berlin

- Kensington Parish Library, Berlin (est. ca.1788)

Bristol

- First Society in Bristol (est.1792)

Brooklyn

- Union Library, Brooklyn (est.1774)

Chatham

- Republican Library Company, Chatham (est.1795)

Chelsea

- T. Hubbard's circulating library, Chelsea

Cheshire

- Cheshire Library Society (est.1792)
- Library in Salem Society, Cheshire (est.1783)
- Library in the Society of Columbia, Cheshire (est.1793)

Cornwall

- United Proprietors Library, Cornwall (ca.1799-1804)

Danbury

- Franklin Library, Danbury (1770–1833)
- Library in Bethel Society, Danbury (est.1793)

Durham

- Book Company of Durham (1733–1856)
- Ethosian Society, Durham (1787–1793)
- New Library Company, Durham (est.1788)

East Haddam

- Hadlyme Society, East Haddam (est.179)

East Hartford

- First Library Company, East Hartford (est.1794)
- Union Library, East Hartford (est.1791)

East Haven

- Union Library, East Haven (est.1796)

East Windsor

- Federal Library, East Windsor (est. ca.17890
- Social Library in East Windsor (est.1791)

Farmington

- Library in First Society, Farmington (est.1795)
- Northington Public Library, Farmington (1789-ca.1799)

Franklin

- Franklin Library, Franklin (est.1790)

Griswold

- North Preston Parish Library, Griswold (est.1761)
- Union Circle of Friends, Griswold (1795–1821)

Guilford

- Library of Killingworth, Lyme, Saybrook and Guilford (est.1737; located in Guilford)
- Library of Saybrook, Lime, and Guilford
- Library in First Society, Guilford (est.1790)

Hadlyme

- Hadlyme Library (est.1789)

Hartford

- Hartford Library Company

Harwinton

- Episcopalian Society Library, Harwinton (est.1793)
- Juvenile Library, Harwinton (est.1797)
- Union Harwinton Library (1798–1857)

Lebanon

- Philogrammatican Society, Lebanon

Litchfield

- St. Paul's Lodge Library, Litchfield (est.1781)

Madison

- Farmer's Library, Madison (est.1793)

Mansfield

- Proprietors Library North Society, Mansfield (est.1795)
- Proprietors Library South Society, Mansfield (est.1795)

Middletown

- Library Company in Middletown (est.1765)
- Middletown Library

Milford

- Associate Library, Milford (1761–1820)
- Milford Library (est.1745)

Naugatuck

- Library in Salem Society, Naugatuck (est.1783)

New Haven

- Mechanic Library Society of New-Haven (est.1793)
- New Haven Library Company
- Yale College Library

New London

- S. Green's Circulating Library, New London

New Milford

- Union Library, New-Milford (est.1796)

Newington

- Book Company in Newington (est.1752)
- Charity Library, Newington (est.1787)

North Haven

- Northill Library, North Haven (est.1792)

Northington

- Northington Public Library

Norwich

- Franklin Library Company, Norwich
- Library in First Society, Norwich (est. 1796)
- Norwich Library Company (est.1793)
- John Trumbull's circulating library, Norwich (est.1796)
- Samuel Trumbull's circulating library, Norwich

Pomfret

- Social Library of Abington in Pomfret (est.1793)
- United English Library for the Propagation of Christian and Useful Knowledge, Pomfret (1739–1805)

Saybrook

- Library of Second Society, Saybrook (est.1795)

Southington

- Union Library Society, Southington (1797–1847)

Stonington

- Stonington Point Library (est.1793)

Suffield

- Suffield Library (est.1791)

Tolland

- Tolland Proprietary Library (est.1787)

Torrington

- Public Library of Torrington and Winchester (est.1787; located in Torrington)

Warren

- Free Mason Lodge Library, Warren (est.1799)
- Public Library in Warren (est.1770)
- Warren library

Waterbury

- Library in First Society, Waterbury (est.1771)
- Union Library, Waterbury (est. ca.1797)

Watertown

- Union Library Society, Watertown (est.1799)

West Simsbury

- Friendship Library, West Symsbury (est.1793)

Weston

- North Fairfield Library, Weston (est. ca.1790)

Wethersfield

- Social Library in Stepney Parish, Wethersfield (est.1794)
- Union Library Society of Wethersfield (1783–1850)

Winchester

- Society of Winsted, Winchester (est.1799)

Windham

- Library Company in Scotland, Widham (1791–1830)
- Library in First Society, Windham (ca.1795-1798)

Wolcott

- Library in Farmingbury, Wolcott (est.1779)

Woodbridge

- Library in Woodbridge (est.1787)

Woodbury

- Union Library, Woodbury (est.1772)

Woodstock

- Library of First Society, Woodstock (est.1797)
- United Lyon Library of Woodstock, also called: United Lynn Library (est.1768)

== See also ==
- Literature of New England
- List of libraries in the United States
