= Kettle Bottom =

Kettle Bottom is a collection of historical poems published in 2004 by Perugia Press in Florence, Massachusetts and written by Diane Gilliam Fisher. The collection's deep focus is on the West Virginia labor battles of 1920 and 1921, such as the Battle of Matewan and Battle of Blair Mountain. Kettle Bottom was named Top Ten Poetry Book for 2005 by American Booksellers Association Book Sense, was winner of the Ohioana Library Association Poetry Book of the Year, was a finalist for the Weatherford Award of the Appalachian Studies Association, and selected for inclusion in The Pushcart Prize XXX: Best of the Small Presses.

== Author's Note ==
In the Author's Note at the beginning of Kettle Bottom, Fisher explains the cause of the conflict between the West Virginia miners and the company owners and operators: "Subsistence wages, the unwillingness of coal operators to slow production for safety reasons, their intransigence with regard to the rights of the miners to organize—these conditions made enemies of the miners and the operators. The situation was aggravated by the organization of life in the camps, which the companies controlled in every respect. Housing was owned by the company; trade was often limited to company-owned stores; the company brought in the doctor, often built the school and brought in the teacher, built the church and supplied the preacher."

== Structure ==
Kettle Bottom consists of 50 poems, which are divided into three sections: I. Summer ~ Fall, II. Raven Light, and III. Winter ~ Summer. The collection is structured to read as a narrative; the poems written chronologically into one coherent, suspenseful plot. "Raven's Light," the only poem in the collection's middle section and the longest poem of all the sections, divides the plot between the time before the miners' rebellion (section I, Summer and Fall) and the time after the miners' rebellion (section III, Winter and Summer).

== Language ==
Diane Gilliam Fisher shows a mastery of language in this collection. One of the strongest literary devices she employs in her poems is an acute sense of dialect and voice, which not only matches time and place (early 1920s in West Virginia), but also character. Her collection is crafted using persona poems. Each is written specifically from one individual's or character's perspective, although the individual who is a particular poem's narrator varies significantly throughout the collection. This unique ability to go outside herself to capture the personalities and viewpoints of others is shown immediately in Diane Gilliam Fisher's opening poem of Kettle Bottom:

.

== Theme ==
The powerful message that Kettle Bottom conveys to its readers is a realization of the horrific history of labor in America and the corruption that circulated during this time, causing dangerous work conditions and inhumane treatment of workers.

== Characters ==
The characters of Diane Gilliam Fisher's poems range from the children, wives, and family of the coal miners, the immigrant works, the company owners and operators, to the news reporters who were brought in to report on the rebellion. One of the most compelling persona poems in the collection tells the life story of an Italian immigrant who came to America with the dream of becoming an expert stonecutter and architect:

By using persona characters such as the Italian immigrant in David, Diane Gilliam Fisher conveys in Kettle Bottom the emotional truth of West Virginia's coal mining history.
