= Jane Brox =

American author

Jane (Martha) Brox (born Sept. 4, 1956) is an American author, who specializes in non-fiction works. Her father was John Brox (1910–1995). She graduated from Colby College in 1978 and currently lives in Maine.

== Awards and honors ==
- 1996 L.L. Winship/PEN New England Award, Here and Nowhere Else: Late Seasons of a Farm and Its Family

== Works ==
=== Books ===
- Here and Nowhere Else: Late Seasons of a Farm and Its Family (1995, ISBN 0-8070-6200-6; ISBN 0-8070-6201-4)
- Five Thousand Days Like This One: An American Family History (1999, Beacon Press, Boston MA)
- Clearing Land, Legacies of the American Farm (2004, ISBN 978-0-86547-649-3)
- Brilliant, the Evolution of Artificial Light (2010; ISBN 978-0-547-05527-5)
- Silence: A Social History of One of the Least Understood Elements of Our Lives (2019, Houghton Mifflin Harcourt ISBN 978-0544702486
- In the Merrimack Valley: A Farm Trilogy (2024, ISBN 978-1567928181)

=== Other works ===
- Brox's website lists 30 magazine articles that she has written
- The website lists 9 publications which have carried her poetry
- The website lists 7 published book reviews written by Brox
- The website lists 11 radio essays produced by Brox, carried primarily by NPR
