= Mitchell Zuckoff =

American professor

Mitchell S. Zuckoff
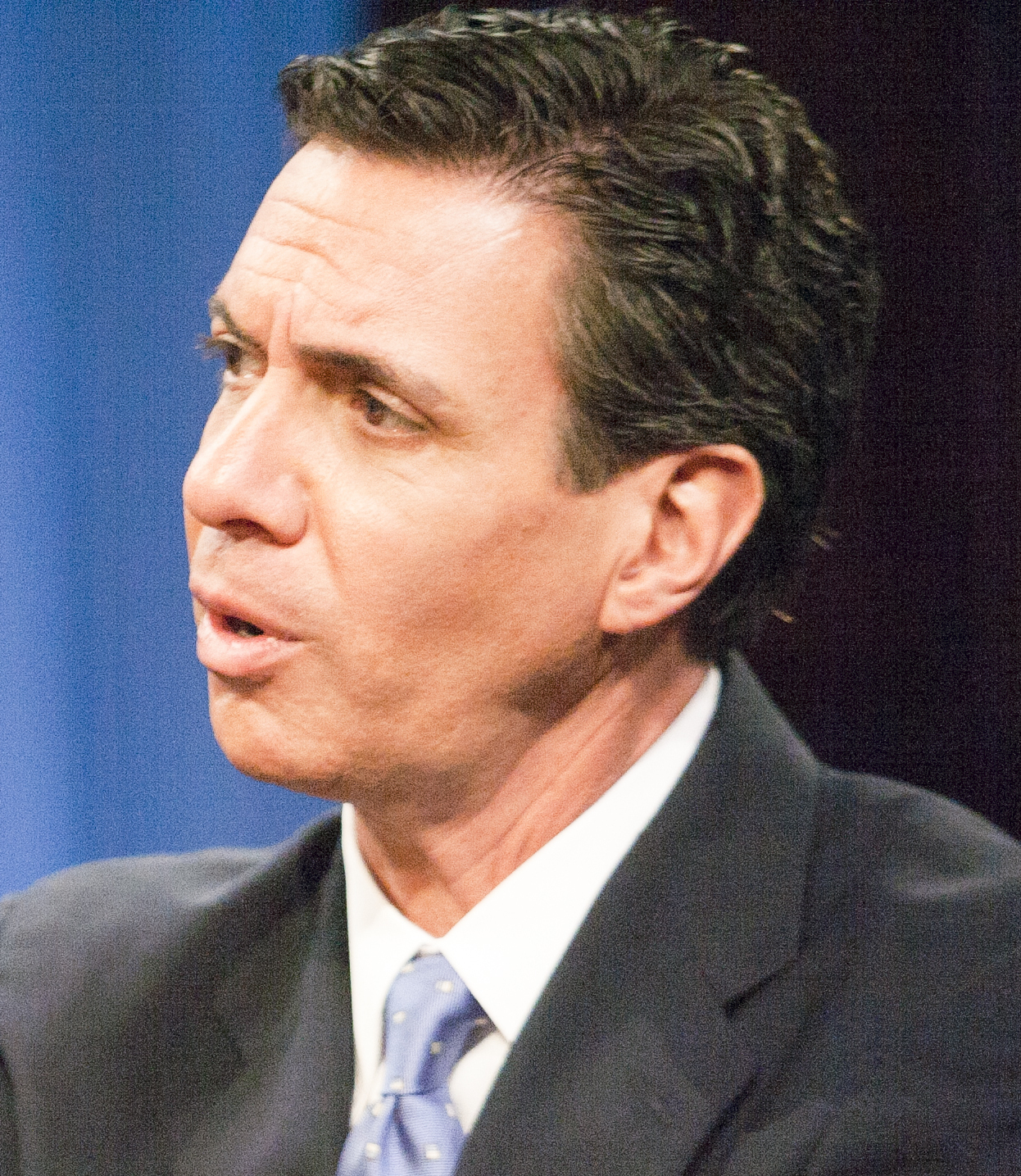
- Zuckoff in 2014
- Born: 18 April 1962
- Occupations: Professor, Author
- Website: https://www.mitchellzuckoff.com/

Mitchell S. Zuckoff is an American professor of communications at Boston University. His books include Lost in Shangri-La and 13 Hours (2014).

== Education ==
Zuckoff received a bachelor's degree from the University of Rhode Island and a master's degree from the University of Missouri. He was a Batten Fellow at the Darden School of Business Administration at the University of Virginia.

== Career ==
Zuckoff was a special projects reporter and a member of the Globe Spotlight Team at the Boston Globe newspaper. He was appointed as a professor in Boston University's College of Communication, and in 2014, was named the first Sumner N Redstone Professor of Narrative Studies at Boston University. He is the author of eight non-fiction books.

== Books ==
13 Hours: The Inside Account of What Really Happened In Benghazi (2014) was co-written with the surviving members of the security team involved in the 2012 Benghazi attack on the U.S. consulate. It tells the story of the terrorist attack from the perspective of the security team, without discussing later political controversies.

Frozen in Time: An Epic Story of Survival and a Modern Quest for Lost Heroes of World War II (2013) is about a U.S. military airplane that crashed on the Greenland glacier during World War II, the subsequent hunt for the plane, and Zuckoff's role in helping to find the plane buried in the ice decades later.

Lost in Shangri-La: A True Story of Survival, Adventure, and the Most Incredible Rescue Mission of World War II (2011) is about a US military airplane called "The Gremlin Special", which crashed on May 13, 1945, in New Guinea, and the subsequent rescue of the survivors. Lost in Shangri-La won the Laurence L. & Thomas Winship/PEN New England Award and spent several months on The New York Times Best Seller list.

His earlier books include Robert Altman: The Oral Biography, Ponzi’s Scheme: The True Story of a Financial Legend, and Choosing Naia: A Family's Journey. He is co-author with Dick Lehr of Judgment Ridge: The True Story Behind the Dartmouth Murders.

Zuckoff's magazine work has appeared in The New Yorker, Fortune, and elsewhere.

As of 2019, ABC was developing a documentary adaptation of his novel Fall and Rise: The Story of 9/11 to commemorate the anniversary.

== Awards and honors ==
As a reporter at The Boston Globe, Zuckoff received the Distinguished Writing Award from the American Society of Newspaper Editors, the Livingston Award for International Reporting (1995), the Heywood Broun Award, and the Associated Press Managing Editors' Public Service Award.

== Publications ==
- 2019 Fall and Rise: The Story of 9/11
- 2014 13 Hours: The Inside Account of What Really Happened In Benghazi, ISBN 1455582271
- 2013 Frozen in Time: An Epic Story of Survival and a Modern Quest for Lost Heroes of World War II, ISBN 0062133438
- 2011 Lost in Shangri-La: A True Story of Survival, Adventure, and the Most Incredible Rescue Mission of World War II, ISBN 0061988340
- 2009 Robert Altman: The Oral Biography, ISBN 0307267687
- 2005 Ponzi's Scheme: The True Story of a Financial Legend, ISBN 1400060397
- 2003 with Dick Lehr: Judgment Ridge: The True Story Behind the Dartmouth Murders, ISBN 0060008458
- 2002 Choosing Naia: A Family's Journey, ISBN 0807028169
