= Mrs. Kimble =

2003 novel by Jennifer Haigh

- First edition cover
- Author: Jennifer Haigh
- Language: English
- Genre: Novel
- Publisher: William Morrow
- Publication date: February 1, 2003
- Publication place: United States
- Media type: Print (hardback & paperback)
- Pages: 400 pp
- ISBN: 0-06-050939-2
- OCLC: 49699470
- Dewey Decimal: 813/.6 21
- LC Class: PS3608.A544 M77 2003

Mrs. Kimble (2003) is Jennifer Haigh's debut novel. Covering several decades from the 1960s to the late 1990s, it is about a man who marries three women and in turn ruins each of their lives. Accordingly, the book is about three rather than just one "Mrs. Kimble." Mrs. Kimble won the PEN/Hemingway Award 2003 for outstanding first fiction.

== Plot summary ==
Born in 1929, Ken Kimble is raised the son of a pastor in Missouri and becomes a minister like his father. While working as a chaplain in a Bible college in Richmond, Virginia he feels attracted to Birdie Bell, one of his female students. Ken, who is 32, marries the 19-year-old Birdie on the spot. The Kimbles have two children, Charlie and Jody. Soon after he is forced to resign over an alleged affair, Ken disappears with Moira Snell, one of his students.

It takes Birdie many years to get over her husband's desertion. Only at the end of the novel, when she is 51, does Birdie find some solace with Curtis Mabry, her teenage sweetheart.

In 1969, at the age of 40, Ken moves to Florida with Moira, where he finds work as a gardener. When he and Moira break up after a few months, he takes a room with Joan Cohen, a rich professional woman of Jewish descent about his own age. They soon become lovers and Joan sees Ken as her last chance at happiness, especially now that one of her breasts has been removed due to breast cancer. Ken pretends to have a Jewish background and, after getting married under Jewish law, starts working as a real estate broker.

Joan realizes that she knows nothing about her husband's past when she finds an old photograph of his two children. Unable to have children of her own, Joan persuades Ken to fetch his children so that they can be raised in Florida. Ken tricks Birdie by offering to take the kids on vacation, which she naively accepts. At first, Charlie and Jody take Joan for a nanny. When he realizes the truth, Charlie steals some money from Joan and escapes with his little sister. Joan soon after dies of breast cancer.

Ken inherits all her money and moves to Washington, D.C. to set up a new real estate business. In the late 1970s, he has a chance meeting with Dinah, who used to babysit Charlie and Jody. Although she is more than 25 years his junior, they get married in 1979 and have one son, Brendan.

Ken one day sells his company and starts a government-funded project providing affordable accommodation for those in need, which gains him a lot of recognition in the community. Dinah has an extramarital affair until Ken, despite his lifelong strict diet and his regular exercise, has a heart attack in 1994 at the age of 65. Hoping that it might cheer Ken up, Dinah invites Charlie and Jody for Thanksgiving, but the family reunion only serves as an eye-opener to Ken Kimble's despicable character.

After recovering from his illness, Ken leaves Dinah. It is soon discovered that he had been embezzling large sums of money from his non-profit organisation and that a small child has died in one of the houses he is responsible for because he refused to have a faulty furnace repaired. Ken dies alone in Florida.

== Reception ==
John Homans wrote in New York that Mrs. Kimble "breathes new life into an old American archetype—the romantic con man." Sara Ivry observes that Mrs. Kimble is "a triptych of one person's duplicitous life as seen by his spouses, with their longing and regret, mired in distinct cultural eras."
