= Yannick Murphy =

American writer

- Occupation: Writer
- Education: Hampshire College (BA); New York University (MA)
- Genre: Novel; short story
- Notable awards: Whiting Award 1990 Fiction; PEN New England Award 2012 The Call

Yannick Murphy is an American novelist and short story writer. She is a recipient of the Whiting Award, National Endowment for the Arts award, Chesterfield Screenwriting award, MacDowell Colony fellowship, and the Laurence L. & Thomas Winship/PEN New England Award.

== Life ==
She grew up in Greenwich Village, New York. She attended P.S. 41, I.S. 70, and Stuyvesant High School where she took a class with Frank McCourt. She graduated with a B.A. from Hampshire College and an M.A. in English from New York University and studied with Gordon Lish. She lived in New York and California. She now lives in Vermont, with her husband, a horse doctor, and their three children. Her PEN New England Award winning novel The Call is based on her husband's life as a large animal veterinarian.

== Awards ==
- 1988 National Endowment for the Arts Literature Fellowships
- 1990 Whiting Award
- 2012 Laurence L. & Thomas Winship/PEN New England Award for The Call
- Chesterfield Screenwriting award
- MacDowell Colony fellowship

== Works ==
=== Books ===
- Stories in Another Language. Knopf. 1987. ISBN 978-0-394-55707-6.
- The Sea of Trees. Houghton Mifflin Co. 1997. ISBN 978-0-395-85012-1.
- Here They Come. Grove Press. 2007. ISBN 978-0-8021-4319-8.
- Signed, Mata Hari. Little, Brown. 2007. ISBN 978-0-316-11264-2.
- In a Bear's Eye. Dzanc Books. 2008. ISBN 978-0-9793123-1-1.
- The Call. Harper Perennial. 2011. ISBN 978-0-06-202314-8.
- This Is The Water. Harper Perennial. 2014. ISBN 978-0062294906.
- By the Time You Read This. Fiction Collective Two. 2021. ISBN 978-1-57366-189-8.
- Things That Are Funny on a Submarine But Not Really. Arcade. 2025. ISBN 978-1-64821-135-5.

=== Children's books ===
- Ahwoooooooo!. Illustrated by Claudio Muñoz. Clarion Books. 2006. ISBN 978-0-618-11762-8.
- Baby Polar. Illustrated by Kristen Balouch. Houghton Mifflin Harcourt. 2009. ISBN 978-0-618-99850-0.
- The Cold Water Witch. Illustrated by Tom Lintern. Tricycle Press. 2010. ISBN 978-1-58246-330-8.

=== Anthologies ===
- Pushcart Prize XXXIX 2014, Pushcart Press (November 12, 2014) ISBN 978-1888889734
- Best Non-Required Reading 2009, Mariner Books (October 8, 2009) ISBN 978-0547241609
- The O. Henry Prize Stories 2007, Anchor Books (May 8, 2007) ISBN 978-0-307-27688-9

=== Stories ===
- "Now is the Time", Big, Big Wednesday, 2017
- "The Prescription", The Literary Review, 2016
- "Too Much for Adele", Conjunctions Online, 2016
- "Forty Words", Zoetrope, 2016
- "Walls", AGNI, 2006
- "The Good Word," One Story, Issue 109, September 2008

Essays

- "The Other End of the Line" New York Times Magazine Best of the Lives Column, March 24, 2017
- "A Real Vermonter" New York Times Magazine Lives Column, November 15, 2015
- "Home and Away" New York Times Magazine Lives Column, February 19, 2006
- "The Big Kahuna" Woof!: Writers on Dogs, Penguin Books (August 26, 2009) ISBN 978-0143116004
