= Literature of New England =

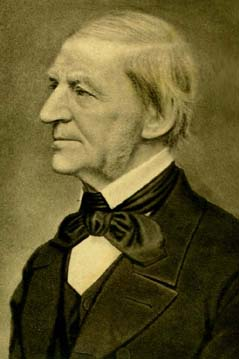
Ralph Waldo Emerson was born in Boston and spent most of his literary career in Concord, Massachusetts.

The literature of New England has had an enduring influence on American literature in general, with themes such as religion, race, the individual versus society, social repression, and nature, emblematic of the larger concerns of American letters.

== History ==
New England's rich literary history begins with the oral tradition of Native American tribes. During the colonial period, Stephen Daye set up the first British-American printing press in Cambridge, Massachusetts, and, in 1640, published the Bay Psalm Book as the first book printed in British North America. England-born Anne Bradstreet, who had settled in Massachusetts Bay Colony, there composed what was soon published as The Tenth Muse Lately Sprung Up in America.

New England was the birthplace of many American Romantic authors and poets. Ralph Waldo Emerson was born in Boston. Henry David Thoreau was born in Concord, Massachusetts, where he famously lived, for some time, by Walden Pond, on Emerson's land. Nathaniel Hawthorne, romantic era writer, was born in historical Salem; later, he would live in Concord at the same time as Emerson and Thoreau. All three of these writers have strong connections to The Old Manse, a home in the Emerson family and a key center of the Transcendentalist movement.

Emily Dickinson lived most of her life in Amherst, Massachusetts. Henry Wadsworth Longfellow was from Portland, Maine, and Edgar Allan Poe was born in Boston.

According to some, the famed Mother Goose, the author of fairy tales and nursery rhymes was originally a person named Elizabeth Foster Goose or Mary Goose who lived in Boston, but there is no evidence to support this. Poets James Russell Lowell, Amy Lowell, and Robert Lowell, a Confessionalist poet and teacher of Sylvia Plath, were all from New England. Anne Sexton, also taught by Lowell, was born and died in Massachusetts. Much of the work of Nobel Prize laureate Eugene O'Neill is associated with the city of New London, Connecticut, where he spent many summers. The 14th U.S. Poet Laureate Donald Hall, a New Hampshire resident, continues the line of renowned New England poets. Noah Webster, the Father of American Scholarship and Education, was born in West Hartford, Connecticut. Pulitzer Prize winning poets Edwin Arlington Robinson, Edna St. Vincent Millay and Robert P. T. Coffin were born in Maine. Writer Sarah Orne Jewett was born and died in South Berwick, Maine, and is famous for her short stories and novels set along the local seacoast.

Poets Stanley Kunitz and Elizabeth Bishop were both born in Worcester, Massachusetts, and Pulitzer Prize–winning poet Galway Kinnell was born in Providence, Rhode Island. Oliver La Farge, a New Englander of French and Narragansett descent, won the Pulitzer Prize for the Novel, the predecessor to the Pulitzer Prize for Fiction, in 1930 for his book Laughing Boy. John P. Marquand grew up in Newburyport, Massachusetts. Novelist Edwin O'Connor, who was also known as a radio personality and journalist, won the Pulitzer Prize for Fiction for his novel The Edge of Sadness. Pulitzer Prize winner John Cheever, a novelist and short story writer, was born in Quincy, Massachusetts, and set most of his fiction in old New England villages based on various South Shore towns around there. E. Annie Proulx was born in Norwich, Connecticut. David Lindsay-Abaire, who won the Pulitzer Prize for Drama in 2007 for his play Rabbit Hole, was raised in Boston.

Ethan Frome, written in 1911 by Edith Wharton, is set in turn-of-the-century New England, in the fictitious town of Starkfield, Massachusetts. Like much literature of the region, it plays off themes of isolation and hopelessness. New England is also the setting for most of the gothic horror stories of H. P. Lovecraft, who lived his life in Providence, Rhode Island. Real New England towns such as Ipswich, Newburyport, Rowley, and Marblehead featured often in his stories alongside fictional locations such as Dunwich, Arkham, Innsmouth and Kingsport. Lovecraft often expressed an appreciation for New England in his personal correspondence, and believed that returning to the area was the reason that his writing improved after he left New York City.

The region has also drawn authors and poets from other parts of the U.S. Mark Twain thought Hartford was the most beautiful city in the U.S. He made it his home, and wrote his masterpieces there. He lived next door to Harriet Beecher Stowe, a local most famous for the novel Uncle Tom's Cabin. John Updike, originally from Pennsylvania, eventually moved to Ipswich, Massachusetts, which served as the model for the fictional New England town of Tarbox in his 1968 novel Couples. Robert Frost was born in California, but moved to Massachusetts during his teen years and published his first poem in Lawrence; his frequent use of New England settings and themes ensured that he would be associated with the region. Arthur Miller, a New York City native, used New England as the setting for some of his works, most notably The Crucible.

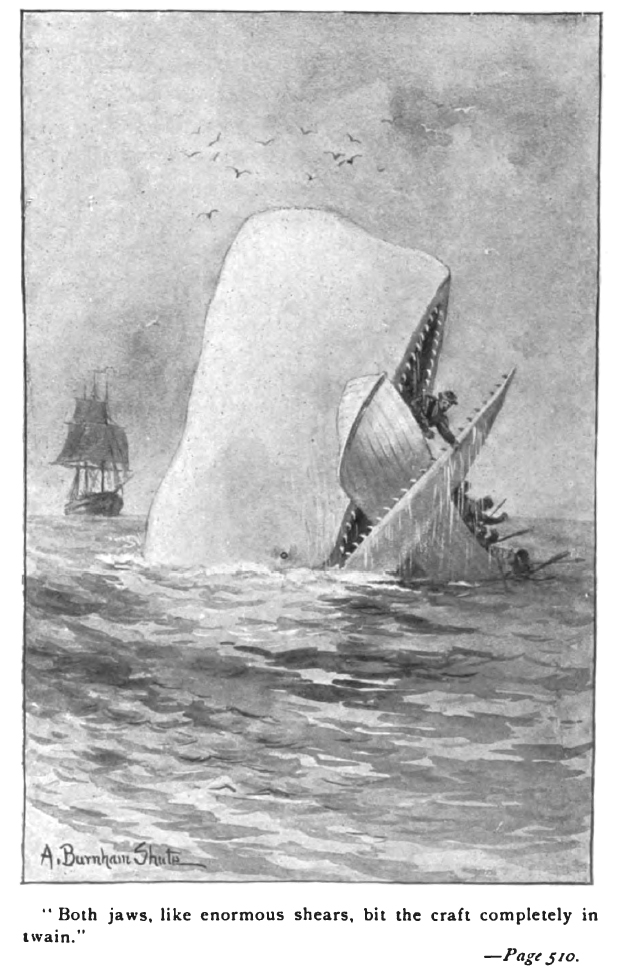
An illustration from Herman Melville's Moby-Dick

Herman Melville, originally from New York City, bought the house now known as Arrowhead in Pittsfield, Massachusetts, and there wrote his novel Moby-Dick. Poet Maxine Kumin was born in Philadelphia, and currently resides in Warner, New Hampshire. Pulitzer Prize–winning poet Mary Oliver was born in Maple Heights, Ohio, and lived in Provincetown, Massachusetts for over fifty years. Charles Simic, who was born in Belgrade, Serbia (at that time Yugoslavia) grew up in Chicago and lives in Strafford, New Hampshire, on the shore of Bow Lake. He is the professor emeritus of American literature and creative writing at the University of New Hampshire. Pulitzer Prize–winning novelist and short story writer Steven Millhauser, whose short story "Eisenheim the Illusionist" was adapted into the 2006 film The Illusionist, was born in New York City and raised in Connecticut.

More recently, Stephen King, born in Portland, Maine, has used the small towns of his home state as the setting for much of his horror fiction, with several of his stories taking place in or near the fictional town of Castle Rock. Just to the south, Exeter, New Hampshire, was the birthplace of best-selling novelist John Irving and Dan Brown, author of The Da Vinci Code. Rick Moody has set many of his works in southern New England, focusing on wealthy families of suburban Connecticut's Gold Coast and their battles with addiction and anomie.

Derek Walcott, a playwright and poet who won the 1992 Nobel Prize for Literature, taught poetry at Boston University. Pulitzer Prize winner Cormac McCarthy, whose novel No Country for Old Men was made into the Academy Award for Best Picture winning film in 2007, was born in Providence, although he moved to Tennessee when he was a boy. New York Times Bestselling author Dennis Lehane, another native of the Boston area, who was born in Dorchester, wrote the novels that were adapted into the films Mystic River, Gone Baby Gone and Shutter Island.

Largely on the strength of its local writers, Boston was for some years the center of the U.S. publishing industry, before being overtaken by New York in the middle of the nineteenth century. Boston remains the home of legacy publishers Houghton Mifflin Harcourt and Pearson Education as well as a cadre of younger independent publishers including Candlewick Press and Charlesbridge Publishing, and was the longtime home of literary magazine The Atlantic Monthly. Merriam-Webster is based in Springfield, Massachusetts. Yankee, a magazine dedicated to New England life, culture, and arts, is based in Dublin, New Hampshire.

== See also ==
- Books in the United States
- Franco American literature
- Libraries in New England:
  - List of libraries in 18th-century Massachusetts
  - List of libraries in 19th-century Boston, Massachusetts
  - List of libraries in Connecticut in the 18th century
- New England Literature Program
