= Chris Bathgate =

American musician (born 1982)

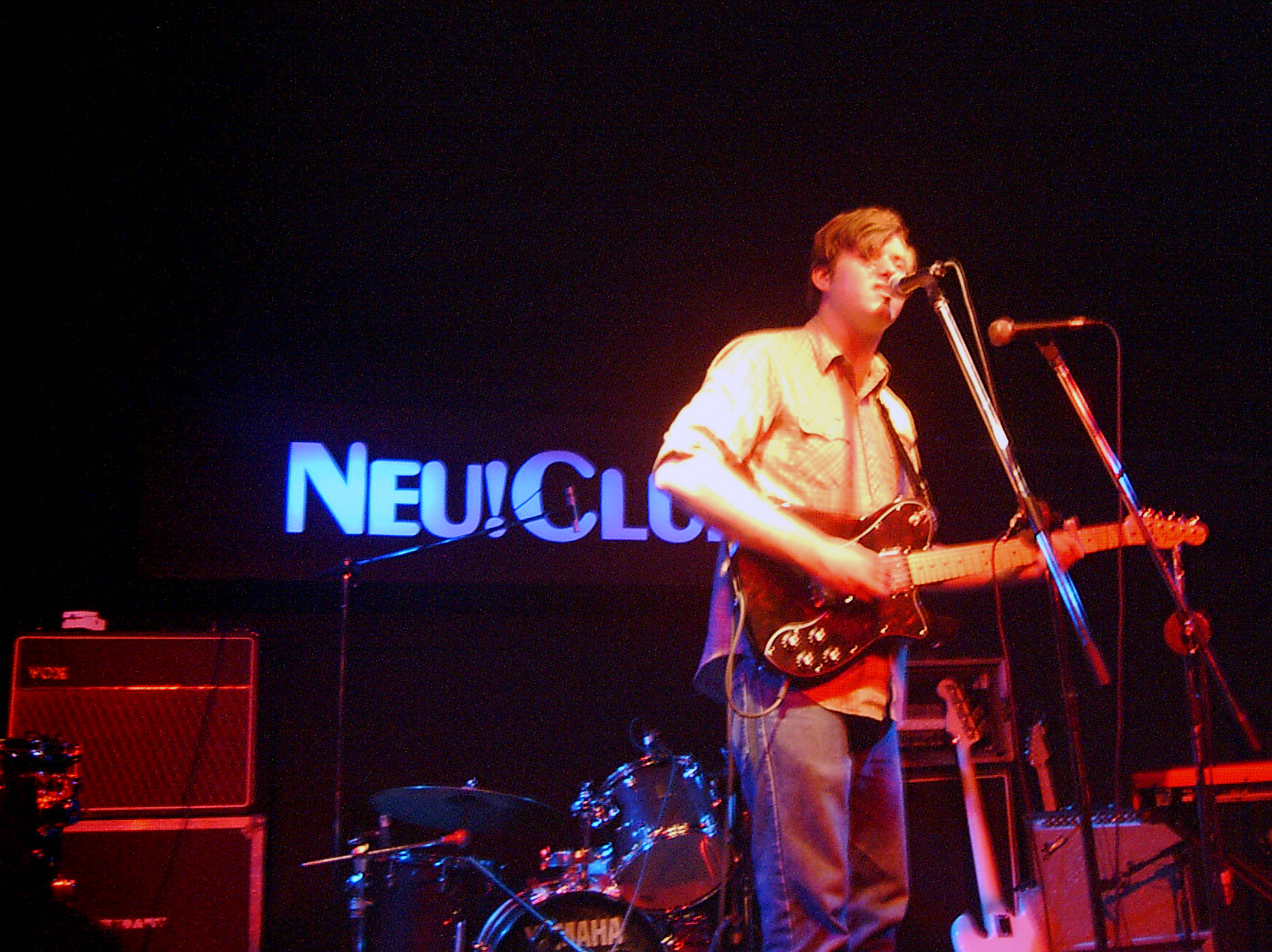
- Bathgate performing in 2007

Background information
- Born: April 21, 1982 (age 44); Ames, Iowa, US
- Origin: Ann Arbor, Michigan, US
- Genres: Folk; indie folk; acoustic; indie rock; alternative rock
- Occupations: Singer-songwriter; musician
- Instruments: Guitar; piano; vocals
- Years active: 1999–present
- Label: Quite Scientific Records
- Formerly of: Ambitious Brothers; The Descent of the Holy Ghost Church

Chris Bathgate (born April 21, 1982) is an American indie folk singer-songwriter and musician. In 2007, he signed to Quite Scientific Records, on which he released his most prominent album to date, A Cork Tale Wake. As of 2025, he has issued ten studio albums, five EPs, and several singles.

== Biography ==
=== Early life ===
Bathgate was born in Ames, Iowa, on April 21, 1982. He began playing music at the age of 16 and relocated to Ann Arbor, Michigan, to attend the University of Michigan as an art and design student.

=== Early career ===
Bathgate played in a heavy metal band for several years before turning to folk. He formed the trio Ambitious Brothers with Michael Beauchamp and Karl Sturk, which released two records before breaking up in 2005.

During a trip to northern Michigan, Bathgate and fellow University of Michigan student Jansen Swy, along with other friends, set music to Swy's poetry, calling the short-lived project the Descent of the Holy Ghost Church. Later on, while attending the New England Literature Program, a University of Michigan summer program in Maine, the group managed to book itself as an opening act for Magnolia Electric Company at Detroit's Magic Stick. They disbanded in 2006.

=== Solo career ===
In 2001, Bathgate launched a solo career and released his debut studio album, Dead Eyed Stranger. This was followed by the EP Twilight Unlimited in 2002, the full-length Create and Consume in 2003, Time Heals All Wounds (2004), and Silence Is for Suckers (2005).

In 2006, Bathgate issued two full-length albums, The Single Road I Longed For and Throatsleep, as well as the EP A Detailed Account of Three Dreams. That year, Real Detroit Weekly named him Best Solo Artist in Michigan.

In 2007, Bathgate traveled with Saturday Looks Good to Me as an opening act on their European tour.

Later that year, he signed to the Michigan record label Quite Scientific Records, on which he released A Cork Tale Wake on June 26. On January 15, 2008, NPR Music chose the opening track, "Serpentine", as its Song of the Day.

In 2011, he published his next album, Salt Year, and he followed it with Dizzy Seas in 2017. His latest, The Significance of Peaches, came out in 2022.

== Discography ==
=== Albums ===
- Dead Eyed Stranger (2001)
- Create and Consume (2003)
- Time Heals All Wounds (2004)
- Silence Is for Suckers (2005)
- The Single Road I Longed For (2006)
- Throatsleep (2006)
- A Cork Tale Wake (2007)
- Salt Year (2011)
- Dizzy Seas (2017)
- The Significance of Peaches (2022)

=== EPs ===
- Twilight Unlimited (2002)
- A Detailed Account of Three Dreams (2006)
- Wait, Skeleton. (2008)
- Oneiro (2012)
- Old Factory (2016)

=== Singles ===
- "Auld Lang Syne" (2007)
- "Serpentine" (2008)
- "Restless" (2008)
- "Do What's Easy" (2008)
- "The Asheville Squints" with Hezekiah Jones (2008)
- "No Silver" (2011)
- "Poor Eliza" (2011)
- "Calvary" (2016)
