= Rinker Buck =

American author (born 1950)

- Born: Charles Rinker Buck; December 29, 1950 (age 74); Morristown, New Jersey, U.S.
- Occupation: Author, journalist
- Period: 1997–2022
- Genre: Memoir, non-fiction
- Notable works: Flight of Passage (1997); If We Had Wings: The Enduring Dream of Flight (2001); First Job: A Memoir of Growing Up at Work (2002); Shane Comes Home (2006); The Oregon Trail: A New American Journey (2015); Life on the Mississippi: An Epic American Adventure (Aug 2022)
- Notable awards: Eugene S. Pulliam Journalism Writing Award

Rinker Buck (December 29, 1950) is an American author who is best known for his 1997 memoir Flight of Passage.

== Early life ==
Rinker Buck was born and raised in Morristown, New Jersey, the fourth child of Mary Patricia Buck (née Kernahan) and political activist and Look Magazine publisher Thomas Francis Buck. He has five brothers and five sisters.

== 1966 flight ==
In the winter of 1965–1966, Rinker (15) and his older brother Kernahan (17), a licensed pilot, devised a plan to rebuild their father's 1948 Piper PA-11 and fly it from Somerset Hills Airport (N64) in Basking Ridge, New Jersey to Capistrano Airport (L38) in San Juan Capistrano, California. Their journey took six days and was completed in July 1966. The flight is the subject of Buck's 1997 memoir Flight of Passage.

== Journalism career ==
Buck began his career in journalism shortly after graduating from Bowdoin College in Brunswick, Maine. His first job was writing for the Berkshire Eagle in 1973. He then served as reporter for New York, Life, Hartford Courant, Adweek and several other national publications.

== Awards ==
- 2016 PEN New England Award
- 2004 Eugene S. Pulliam Journalism Writing Award
- 2003 Society of Professional Journalists Sigma Delta Chi Award
- Max Kurant Award for Excellence in Aviation Coverage (AOPA)

== Bibliography ==
- Flight of Passage (1997) – Hyperion Books
- If We Had Wings: The Enduring Dream of Flight (2001) – Crown Publishing Group
- First Job: A Memoir of Growing Up at Work (2002) – PublicAffairs
- Shane Comes Home (2006) – HarperCollins
- The Oregon Trail: A New American Journey (2015) – Simon & Schuster
- Life on the Mississippi: An Epic American Adventure (Aug 2022) – Simon & Schuster
