= The Oregon Trail: A New American Journey =

2015 non-fiction book by Rinker Buck

- First edition
- Author: Rinker Buck
- Cover artist: Michael Gellatly
- Language: English
- Subject: History/U.S. History/Oregon Trail
- Genre: Non-fiction
- Publisher: Simon & Schuster
- Publication date: June 30, 2015
- Publication place: United States
- Pages: 464 pages
- ISBN: 9781451659160 (hardcover) 9781442386228 (audio book) 9781451659184 (Ebook)

The Oregon Trail: A New American Journey is a 2015 non-fiction book written by Rinker Buck, author of Flight of Passage (Hyperion Books, 1997). The Oregon Trail is an account of Buck's 2011 journey along the Oregon Trail in a covered wagon. It was published by Simon & Schuster in hardcover, audio book and eBook formats.
