= Cheryl Savageau =

American poet and writer (born 1950)

Cheryl Savageau (born April 14, 1950) is an American writer and poet.

== Biography ==
Savageau is of French-Canadian and Abenaki descent. Savageau was born in Worcester, Massachusetts, but grew up in a small island neighborhood on Lake Quinsigamond in Shrewsbury. She refers to this lake and her childhood growing up along the shore in her children's book Muskrat Will Be Swimming. She graduated from Clark University with a Bachelor of Science degree with focus on English and Philosophy.

It was in college that she really discovered her passion for writing and the connection it gave her to readers. Poetry and storytelling became Savageau's outlet for sharing stories about her ancestors and her Native culture.

She was a founding member of Oak and Stone Storytellers, a storytelling group that told stories in concert to adults as well as to children in schools and libraries.

During her career, Savageau has won numerous awards for her work. Her children's book, Muskrat Will Be Swimming, was a Smithsonian Notable Book (1996) award winner, won the Skipping Stones Award for children's Environmental Books (1997), and the Best Children's Book Award (1997), from Wordcraft Circle of Native Writers and Storytellers. For her work mentoring young and beginning writers, she was awarded Mentor of the Year from Wordcraft Circle of Native Writers and Storytellers (1998).

Savageau has also won various fellowships for poetry including the Massachusetts Artists Foundation and the National Endowment for the Arts.

Her writing focuses on retelling Abenaki stories, including the stories of women and the working class. Also a visual artist, she has exhibited her quilts, paintings and other works.

== Publications ==
=== Autobiography ===
Out of the Crazywoods. University of Nebraska Press (Lincoln). 2020. ISBN 9781496219039.

=== Poetry ===
- Home Country. Farmington, Maine: Alice James Books. 1992. ISBN 9780914086949.
- Dirt Road Home. Willimantic, Conn.: Curbstone Press. 1995. ISBN 9781880684306.
- Mother/Land. London: Salt Publishing. 2006. ISBN 9781844712694.
- The Ladder is-pushed down. Harare.Janvier Gennix Safari.2025

=== Children's books ===
Muskrat Will Be Swimming. Rising Moon. 1996. ISBN 9780873586047.

=== Anthology contributions ===
- Melissa Tuckey, ed. (2018). Ghost Fishing: An Eco-Justice Poetry Anthology. University of Georgia Press. ISBN 9780820353159.
- Dawnland Voices. Lincoln, Neb.: University of Nebraska Press. 2014. ISBN 9780803246867.
- Sunken Garden Poetry, Brad Davis, ed. Wesleyan University Press, Middletown, Ct. 2012
- Living in Storms. Tom Schram, ed. Eastern University Press, 2008.
- French Connections: A Gathering of Franco-American Poets. Christine Gelineau, ed. Louisiana Literature Press, 2007.
- New Directions Reading, Writing, and Critical Thinking. Peter S. Gardner, ed. Cambridge University Press, New York, 2005.
- Approaching Literature in the 21st Century. Peter Schakel and Jack Ridl, eds. Bedford/St. Martin's Press, Boston. 2005.
- Poetry from Sojourner: A Feminist Anthology, Ruth Lepson, ed. University of Illinois Press, Urbana, Illinois. 2004
- Connections: Reading and Writing in Cultural Contexts. Judith A. Stanford, ed. Rivier College, Mayfield Publishing, Calif. 2001.
- My Home As I Remember It. Native Women in the Arts Press, Toronto, Ontario, Canada, 1999.
- The Eye of the Deer. Carolyn Dunn Anderson and Carol Comfort, eds. Aunt Lute Books, 1999.
- Poetry Nation. Regie Cabico and Todd Swift, eds. Véhicule Press, Montréal, Canada, 1999.
- Identity Lessons: Learning American Style. Maria Mazziotti Gillan and Jennifer Gillan, eds. Viking Penguin, 1999.
- Approaching Poetry: Perspectives and Responses. Peter Schakel and Jack Ridl, eds. St. Martin's Press, 1997.
- Through the Kitchen Window. Arlene Arvakian, ed. University of Massachusetts, Spring, 1997.
- Durable Breath. John E. Smelcer and D.L. Birchfield, eds. Salmon Run Press, 1994.
- Two Worlds Walking. Diane Glancy and C.W. Truesdale, eds. New Rivers Press, 1994.
- Returning the Gift. Joseph Bruchac, ed. Greenfield Review Press, 1994.
- Poetry Like Bread Martín Espada, ed. Curbstone Press, 1994.
- An Ear to the Ground. Marie Harris and Kathleen Aguero, eds. University of Georgia Press, 1989.
