= Santa Maria Nuova, Cortona =

Church in Tuscany, Italy

Coordinates: 43.2793°N 11.9893°E

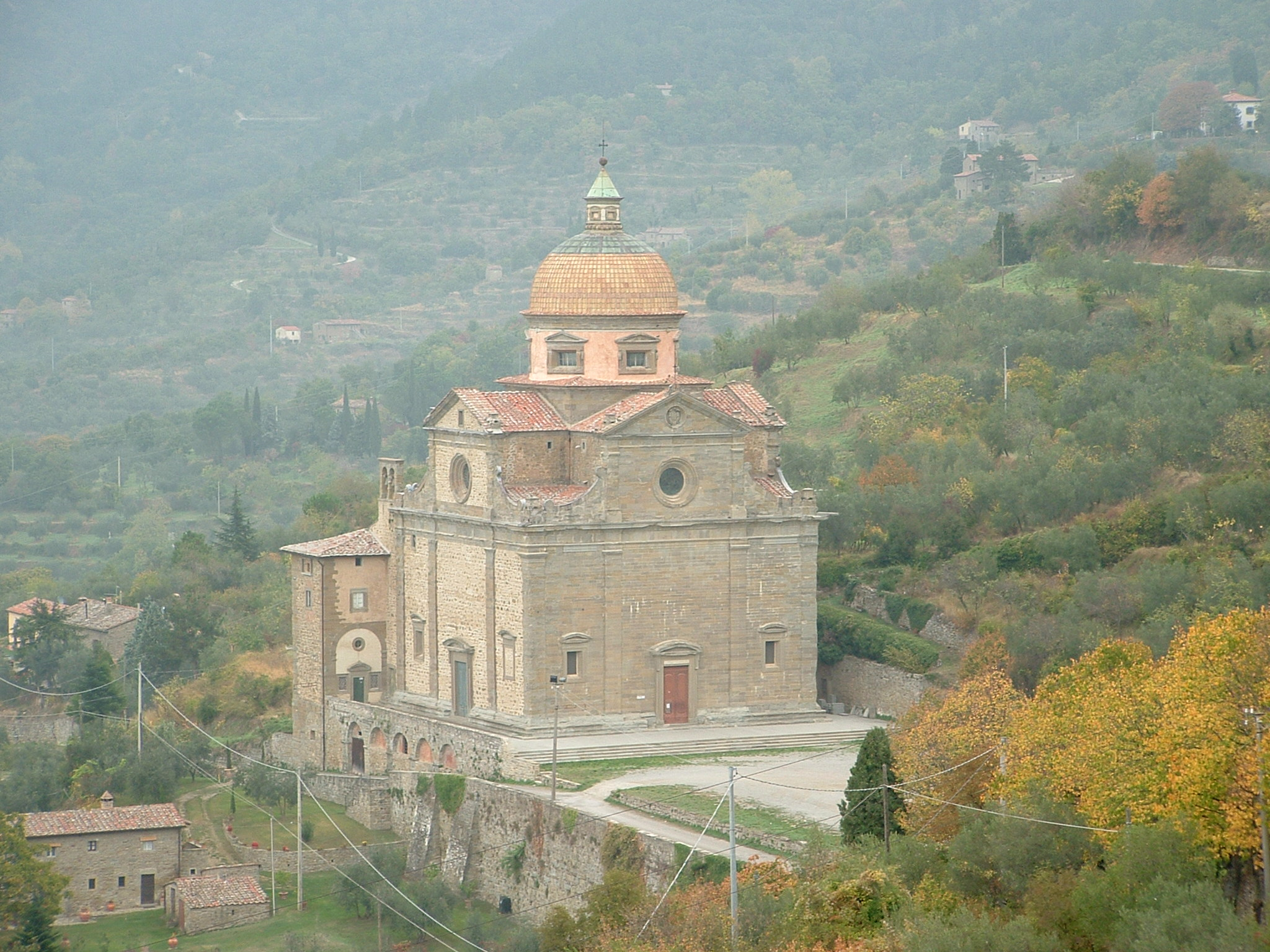
Santa Maria Nuova, Cortona

The church of Santa Maria Nuova is a Roman Catholic place of worship, located just outside the walls of the town of Cortona, in Tuscany, Italy.

== Construction ==
The church was built to house a miraculous image of the Blessed Virgin that previously had been in a private chapel. Construction was begun in 1550, and the church was consecrated in 1610. The original church design is attributed to Giorgio Vasari, and modified by Battista Cristoforo Fanelli. Nestled half-way up and against a hillside, the ground plan is a square, and the church is surmounted by a dome with a lantern, completed in 1600.

== Furnishings ==
The high altar was completed by Cortonese artist Bernardino Radi. The altarpiece to the right of the entrance holds a painting by Alessandro Allori, depicting the Birth of the Virgin Mary (16th century). The rosette window on the facade was designed by Urbano Urbani (16th century) and depicts an Adoration of the Magi.

== See also ==
- 17th-century Western domes
