= San Jacopo sopr'Arno =

Church in Florence, Italy

Coordinates: 43.768231°N 11.250386°E

Church of Saint James on the Arno (Chiesa di San Jacopo Soprarno)
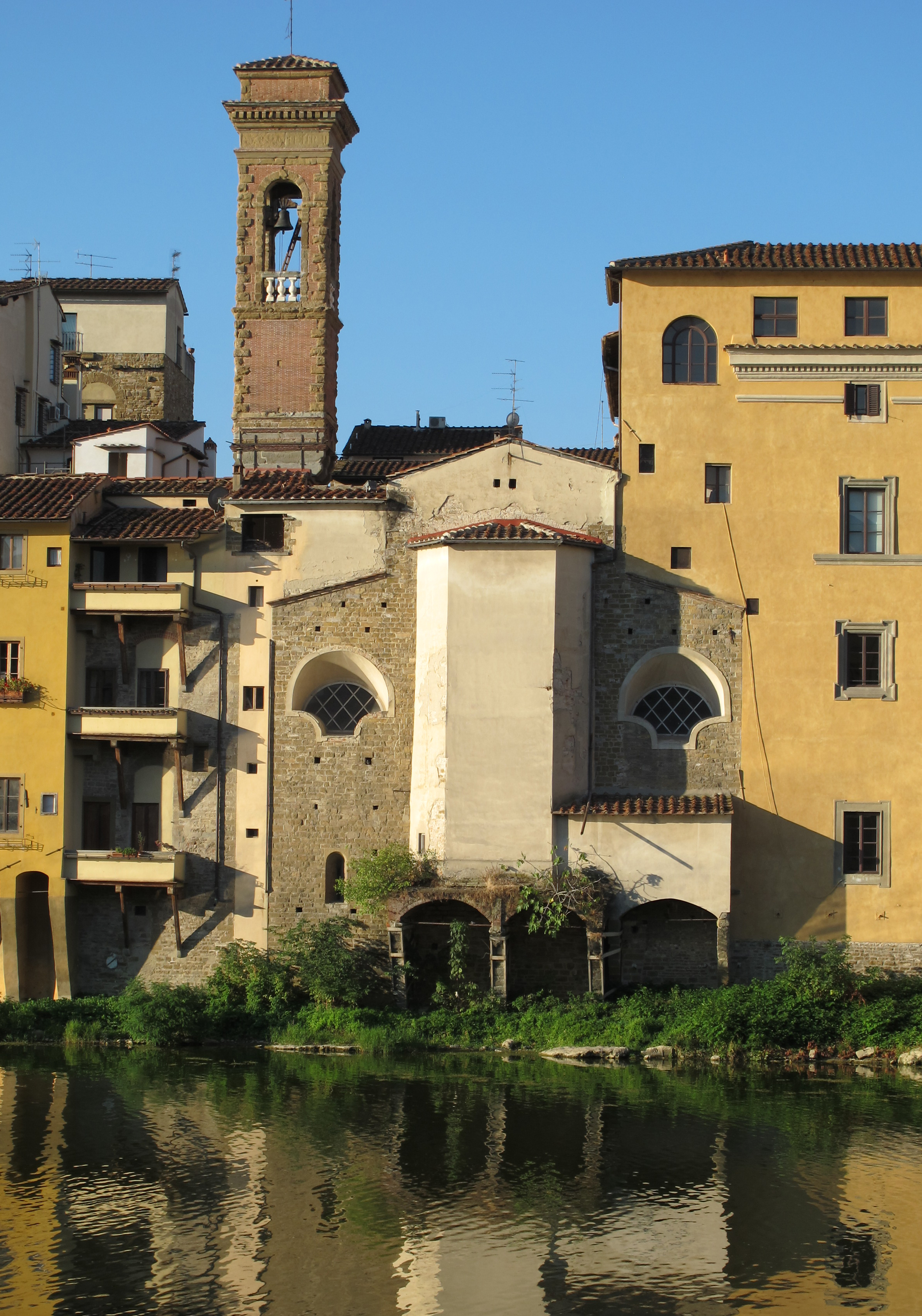
- View of the church from the Arno River.

Religion
- Affiliation: Greek Orthodox
- Province: Florence

Location
- Location: Florence, Italy
- Interactive map of Church of Saint James on the Arno (Chiesa di San Jacopo Soprarno)

Architecture
- Type: Church
- Style: Romanesque; Baroque

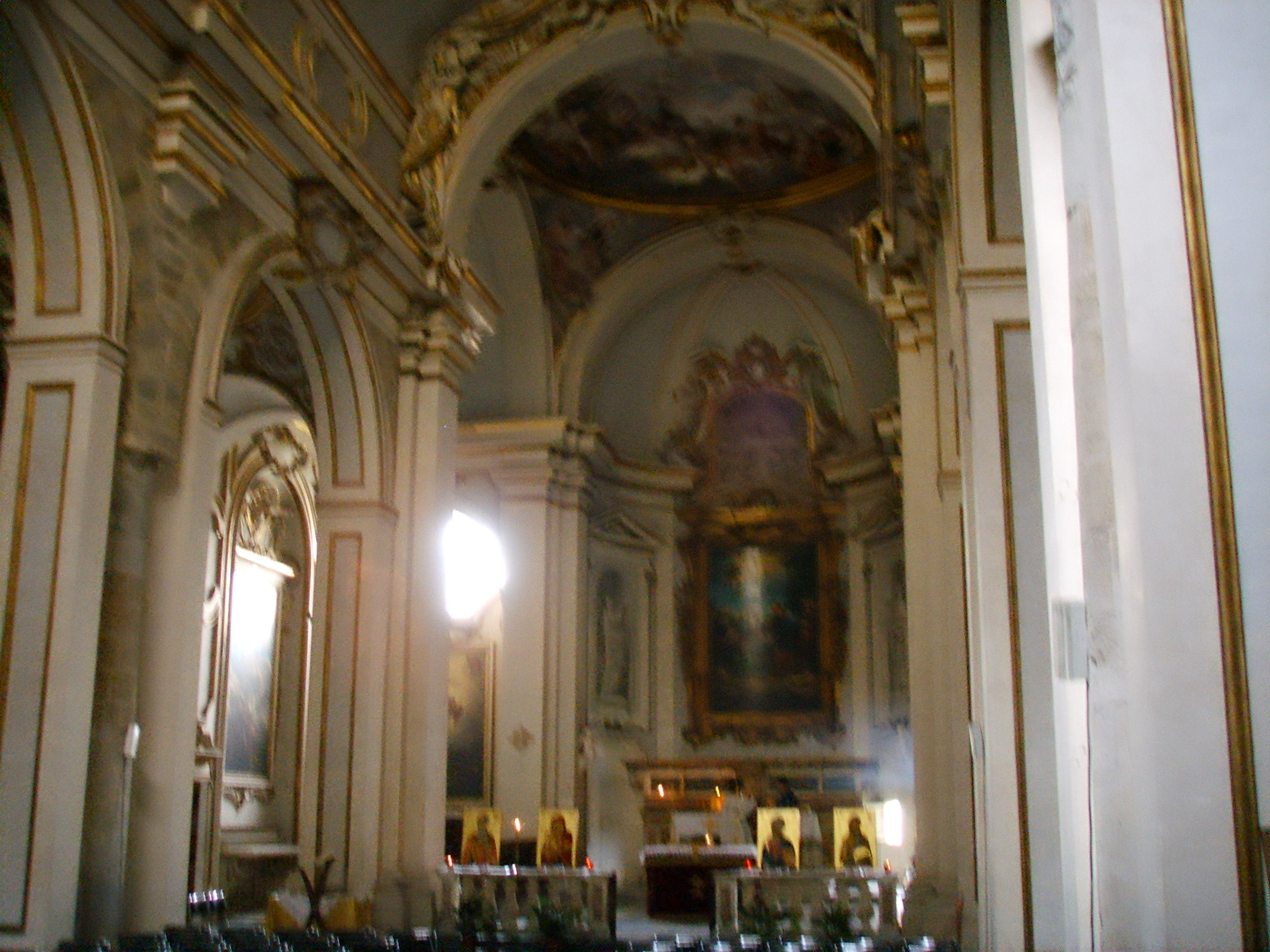
The altar of San Jacopo sopr'Arno

San Jacopo sopr'Arno is a church in Florence, Italy.

The church was built in the 10th–11th centuries in Romanesque style. It subsequently experienced heavy modifications including the addition of a triple-arched portico.

According to the Renaissance art historian Giorgio Vasari, Filippo Brunelleschi built here a chapel, the Ridolfi Chapel, in which he studied, in smaller scale, architectural elements later used in his famous dome of Santa Maria del Fiore. The chapel is now destroyed. Since 1542 it was held by Franciscans of the Minorite Order. The entrance portico was remade by order of Cosimo I de' Medici in 1580, using the architect Bernardino Radi. The bell tower was designed by Gherardo Silvani in 1660.

The church was damaged when the Arno River flooded Florence in 1966. Repairs of the church after flood led to the restoration of some of the historical architectural features, and the discovery of columns belonging to the original Romanesque church in the Baroque interior.

== See also ==
- Late medieval domes
