= Bernardino Radi =

Italian sculptor

Bernardino Radi (2 December 1581 – 29 May 1643) was an Italian engraver and architect, born in Cortona, who etched a set of plates depicting architectural ornaments and monuments, published in Rome in 1618, under the title of Varie invenzoni per depositi di Bernardino Radi Cortonese.

The entrance portico of San Jacopo sopr'Arno in Florence was remade in 1580 by Radi. He helped design the rose window for the church of Santa Maria Nuova, Cortona.
