= Madonna and Child with St Dominic and St Thomas Aquinas =

Fresco by Fra Angelico

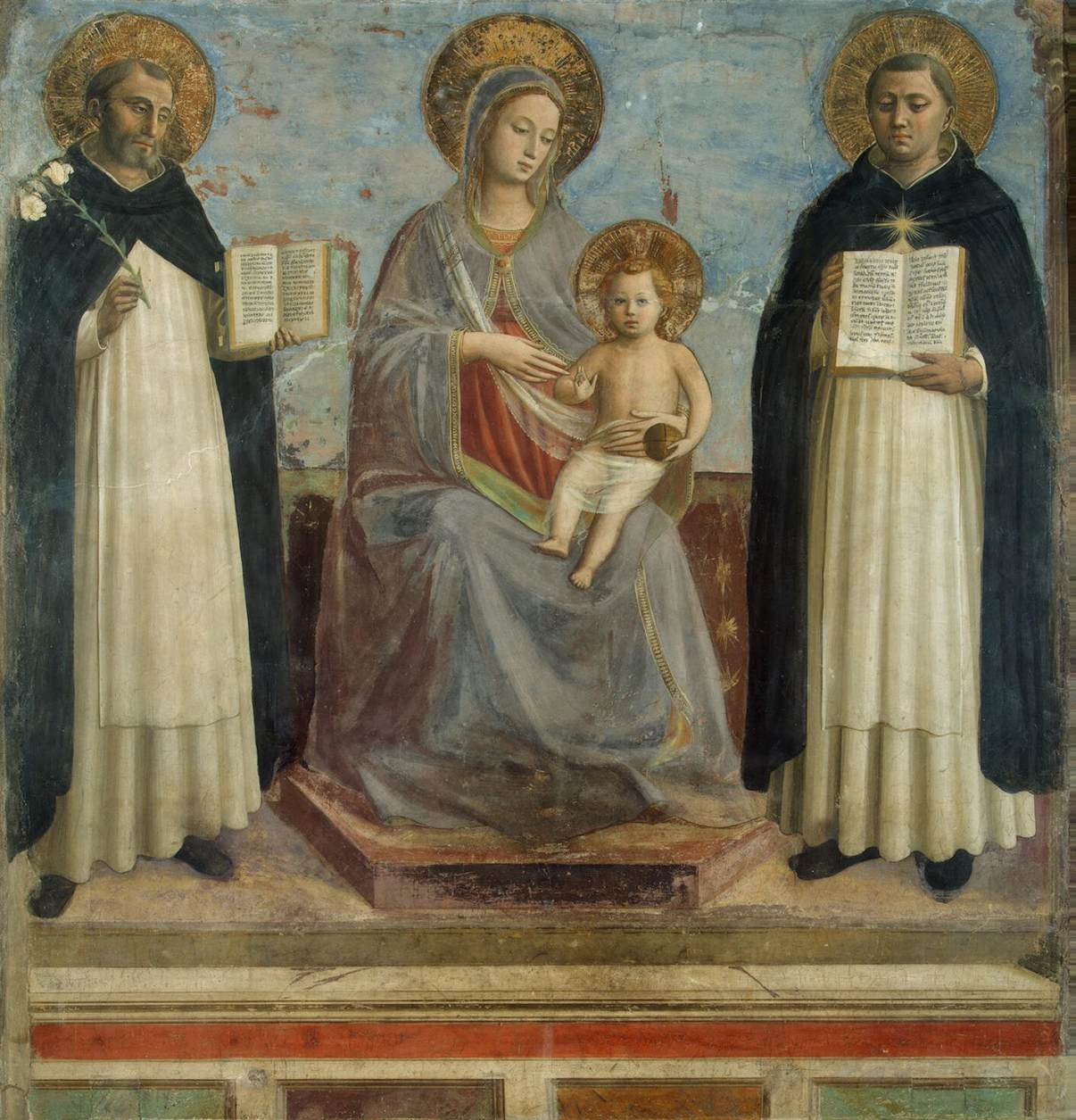

Madonna and Child is a c. 1435 fresco fragment by the Italian Renaissance master Fra Angelico in the sacra conversazione style. It was originally painted in the dormitory of the Convent of San Domenico, Fiesole. It was removed from the wall after the convent's suppression during the Napoleonic occupation of Italy and is now in the Hermitage Museum in St Petersburg.

The two male saints were both Dominicans. A similar fresco from c. 1438 of the Madonna and Child with St Dominic and St Peter Martyr by the same artist survives above the doorway of the church of San Domenico in Cortona, whilst the same artist's Crucifixion with Mourners and St Dominic (Louvre) originated at San Domenico in Fiesole.
