= Under the Tuscan Sun =

Under the Tuscan Sun may refer to:

- Under the Tuscan Sun (book), a 1996 memoir by Frances Mayes
- Under the Tuscan Sun (film), a 2003 American film, based on the memoir
