= Flood Ladies =

- Formation: 1966
- Headquarters: Florence, Italy
- Region served: Worldwide

The Flood Ladies were a group of international female artists who contributed artworks to the city of Florence following the catastrophic 1966 flood of the Arno as a sign of solidarity and to help repair the psychological damage done by the flood. The group was formed in Florence, Italy in 1966. Contributors to the collection lived all over the world. In 2014 the organization Advancing Women Artist Foundation headed an effort to preserve, exhibit and acknowledge the contribution of these women.

== History ==
Following the devastating flooding that damaged and destroyed cultural treasures of Florence, Italy in 1966, while those losses can never be replaced, the generosity of some of Italy’s most significant women artists of the 20th century as well as distinguished painters and sculptors from around the world brought donations of hundreds of notable creative works to the city.

In 2014 the City of Florence opened the "Museum of the 1900s" to showcase these works.

The story of the Flood Ladies was chronicled in the 2014 book "When the World Answered. Florence, Women Artists and the 1966 Flood" and the 2015 PBS documentary of the same name.

== Members and names ==
- Carla Accardi
- Maya Berezowska
- Pasquarosa Bertoletti Marcelli
- Stefania Giudi
- Edita Broglio
- Amalia Ciardi Dupré
- Lea Colliva
- Liliana Cossovel
- Maria Luisa De Romans
- Marianne Gabor
- Beatrice Lazzeri
- Fiora Leone
- Rita Longa
- Paola Levi Montalcini
- Titina Masell
- Daphne Maugham Casorati
- Costanza Mennyey Capogrossi
- Genni Mucchi
- Livia Papini De Rurmik Amelia Pelaez
- Pierca – Pier Carla Reghenzi
- Adriana Pincherle
- Antonietta Raphael Mafai
- Marcella Rusconi
- Imelde Siviero
- Sarai Sherman
- Rita Saglietto
- Paola Troise
- Lesbia Vent Dumois

== Bibliography ==
- Jane Fortune, Linda Falcone, When the World Answered: Florence, Women Artists and the 1966 Flood. The Florence Press l 2014
- Advancing Women Artist Foundation. "Eight of the Flood Ladies" 2014
