= Frances Mayes =

American writer

- Born: March 23, 1940 (age 86); Fitzgerald, Georgia, U.S.
- Education: Randolph-Macon Woman's College; University of Florida (BA); San Francisco State University (MA)
- Occupations: Memoirist; Novelist; Poet; Professor
- Spouse: Edward Kleinschmidt Mayes
- Children: Ashley King
- Writing career
- Notable work: Under the Tuscan Sun
- Website: francesemayes.com

Frances Mayes (born March 23, 1940) is an American writer. Her 1996 memoir Under the Tuscan Sun was on the New York Times Best Seller list for over two years and was the basis for the film Under the Tuscan Sun.

== Biography ==
Frances Mayes was born on March 23, 1940, in Fitzgerald, Georgia to Garbert Mayes, a cotton mill manager, and Frankye Mayes. Mayes was the youngest of three sisters. Garbert Mayes died of cancer at age 47, when Frances was 14.

Mayes initially attended Randolph-Macon Woman's College in Lynchburg, Virginia starting in 1958. She later transferred to the University of Florida, where she completed her BA. While at school at the University of Florida, Mayes met her first husband, William Frank King. The couple married when Mayes was 22 and relocated to California. They had one daughter, Ashley King.

Mayes returned to school and earned her MA from San Francisco State University in 1975. After graduating, Mayes became Professor of Creative Writing at her alma mater San Francisco State University, as well as director of the Poetry Center and Chair of the Department of Creative Writing.

Mayes and her husband William divorced in the 1980s. After her divorce, Mayes began dating Edward Kleinschmidt, a fellow poet and professor employed at nearby Santa Clara University.

In 1989, Mayes bought a historic villa named Bramasole located in Cortona, Italy. She and her partner Kleinschmidt began an extensive renovation of the abandoned property, which Mayes documented in her 1996 memoire Under the Tuscan Sun. The book became a surprise hit and remained on the New York Times bestseller list for over two years. The success of Under the Tuscan Sun allowed Mayes to become a full-time writer.

Mayes and Kleinschmidt were married in 1998, and Kleinschmidt took the last name Mayes.

In 2007, the Mayes family moved their American residence from San Francisco to North Carolina, along with Frances' daughter Ashley. Frances and Edward Mayes currently divide their time between their homes in North Carolina and Cortona, Italy.

== Writing ==
=== Poetry, novels and essays ===
Mayes has published several works of poetry: Climbing Aconcagua (1977), Sunday in Another Country (1977), After Such Pleasures (1979), The Arts of Fire (1982), Hours (1984), and Ex Voto (1995).

She wrote The Discovery of Poetry, a text for readers and writers.

Mayes's first novel, Swan, was published in 2002. Her novel Women in Sunlight was published in 2019.

A Place in the World: Finding the Meaning of Home was published in 2022 and was long-listed for the PEN essay category.

Her books have been translated in more than 55 languages.

=== Under the Tuscan Sun and Related Works ===
In 1996, Mayes published the book Under the Tuscan Sun: At Home in Italy, which was on the New York Times Best Seller list for over two years. The book is a memoir of Mayes buying, renovating, and living in an abandoned villa in rural Cortona in Tuscany, a region of Italy. A film loosely based on the book, Under the Tuscan Sun. was released in 2003, adapted by director Audrey Wells. In 1999, Bella Tuscany: The Sweet Life in Italy was published, and in 2000, In Tuscany. The book Bringing Tuscany Home was published in 2004, a collaborative effort of Mayes and her husband Edward Kleinschmidt Mayes with photographer Steven Rothfeld. Another memoir, Every Day in Tuscany, was released in March 2010.

Also a food-and-travel writer, Mayes is the author of The Tuscan Sun Cookbook and A Year in the World: Journeys of A Passionate Traveller (2006), narratives of her and her husband's travels in Greece, Turkey, Spain, Morocco and other countries. In 2019 she published See You in the Piazza, an ode to favorite locations, and in 2020 Always Italy, a journey to all twenty regions of Italy. That book won the Gold Medal from the SATWF Lowell Thomas Travel Journalism Competition and the Gold for Best Travel Book by the North American Travel Journalists Association. In 2023, the cookbook Pasta Veloce was published. Her books have been published in over fifty languages and many have been international best sellers.

She is also an Italian Citizen.

== Books ==
- Sunday in Another Country
- The Arts of Fire
- After Such Pleasures
- Hours
- Ex Voto
- The Book of Summer
- The Discovery of Poetry: A Field Guide to Reading and Writing
- Under the Tuscan Sun: At Home in Italy
- Bella Tuscany
- A Year in the World: Journeys of A Passionate Traveller
- Every Day in Tuscany
- In Tuscany (with Edward Mayes and photographs by Bob Krist)
- Bringing Tuscany Home: Sensuous Style from the Heart of Italy (with Edward Mayes and photographs by Steven Rothfeld)
- The Tuscan Sun Cookbook: Recipes from My Italian Kitchen (with Edward Mayes and photographs by Steven Rothfeld)
- Under Magnolia: A Southern Memoir
- Swan
- Shrines: Images of Italian Worship (photographs by Steven Rothfeld)
- Women in Sunlight
- See You in the Piazza
- Always Italy
- A Place in the World: Finding the Meaning of Home
- Pasta Veloce (Susan Wyler co-author and photographs by Steven Rothfeld)
- A Great Marriage

== See also ==
- Eat, Pray, Love
