= Guzzetti =

Guzzetti is a surname. Notable people with the surname include:

- Alfred Guzzetti (born 1942), American experimental filmmaker
- César Augusto Guzzetti (1925–1988), Argentine vice admiral
- Damiano Giulio Guzzetti (born 1959), Italian Roman Catholic bishop
- Michela Guzzetti (born 1992), Italian swimmer

== See also ==
- Guzzetti Chapel
