= Cottini =

Cottini may refer to:

- Andrea Cottini (born 1976), Italian footballer
- Antonio Cottini (fl. 1681 – c. 1708), Italian operatic bass known as Cottini
