= Kleinschmidt =

Kleinschmidt is an occupational surname of German origin, which means "small smith", that is, a maker of small forged items and metal hand tools. The name may refer to:

- Edward Kleinschmidt (1876–1977), American inventor
- Edward Kleinschmidt Mayes (born 1951), American poet
- Franz Heinrich Kleinschmidt (1812–1864), German missionary
- Jutta Kleinschmidt (born 1962), German race driver
- Kurt Kleinschmidt (born 1967), German politician
- Lena Kleinschmidt (1835–1886), American jewel thief
- Mark Kleinschmidt (politician) (born 1970), American politician
- Mark Kleinschmidt (rower) (born 1974), German rower
- Otto Kleinschmidt (1870–1954), German ornithologist
- Paul Kleinschmidt (1883–1949), German painter
- Samuel Kleinschmidt (1814 –1886), German missionary
- Theodor Kleinschmidt (1834–1881), German trader and explorer
- Tom Kleinschmidt (born 1973), American basketball player
- Wilhelm Kleinschmidt (1907–1941), German submarine commander

== Other uses ==
- Kleinschmidt family, fictional characters in the television series King of the Hill
- Kleinschmidt Inc, an American e-commerce company
- Morkrum-Kleinschmidt, a former name of the Teletype Corporation
- Kleinschmidt keyboard perforator, invented by Edward Kleinschmidt
