= Edward Kleinschmidt Mayes =

American poet and writer

- Born: October 29, 1951 (age 74); Winona, Minnesota, U.S.
- Occupations: Writer; Bramasole Olive Oil
- Spouse: Frances Mayes
- Writing career
- Genre: Poetry
- Notable awards: Juniper Prize, Associated Writing Programs Award, National Endowment for the Arts Award
- Website: www.edwardmayes.com

Edward Kleinschmidt Mayes (born October 29, 1951) is an American poet and writer. Mayes' books of poetry include Magnetism, First Language, To Remain, Works and Days, Speed of Life, Bodysong and Obbligato.

== Biography ==
Edward Kleinschmidt Mayes was born in Winona, Minnesota.

Mayes received a BA in English from Saint Mary's College, a Christian Brothers college in Winona, Minnesota. He went on to earn an MA in creative writing from Hollins College in Virginia in 1976.

After finishing graduate school, Mayes moved to San Francisco, California. He began teaching at Santa Clara University in 1981, where he established the university's Creative Writing Program. In 1993, he became an associate professor of English and served as the Director of the Creative Writing Program.

Mayes' long-time partner is the writer Frances Mayes, whom he met in the mid 1980s. In 1990, the couple purchased a home in Cortona, Italy, and began to regularly summer and winter there, documented in the memoir Under the Tuscan Sun and its sequels Bella Tuscany and In Tuscany.

Edward and Frances married in 1998 and Edward took her last name.

Mayes and his wife currently live in Hillsborough, North Carolina and Cortona, Italy.

== Writings ==
To date, Mayes has published six books of poetry: Magnetism (1987), First Language (1990), Works and Days (1999), Speed of Life (1999), Bodysong (1999) and Obbligato (2025). He has also published the individual poem To Remain.

In 1997, Mayes received a National Endowment for the Arts Fellowship in poetry.

In 1999, Works and Days received the Associated Writing Programs Award Series in Poetry accolade.

His poems have appeared in American Poetry Review, Gettysburg Review, Iowa Review, Massachusetts Review, New England Review, The New Yorker, Poetry (Chicago), TriQuarterly, Virginia Quarterly Review, and The Best American Poetry.

His books have received the Juniper Prize, the Gesù Award, the Bay Area Book Reviewers Association Award, and the Associated Writing Programs Prize. He's also received the Cecil Hemley Memorial Award and the Gordon Barber Memorial Award from the Poetry Society of America, and a National Endowment for the Arts Fellowship in Poetry.

Mayes also collaborated with his wife Frances Mayes to write In Tuscany (photographs by Bob Krist), Bringing Tuscany Home: Sensuous Style from the Heart of Italy (photographs by Steven Rothfeld), and The Tuscan Sun Cookbook: Recipes from My Italian Kitchen (photographs by Steven Rothfeld).
