= Sarai Sherman =

American artist (1922–2013)

- Born: September 2, 1922; Philadelphia, Pennsylvania, United States
- Died: October 24, 2013 (aged 91); New York, New York
- Education: Temple University, Tyler School of Art, Philadelphia, University of Iowa, Iowa
- Known for: Abstract painting, figurative
- Movement: Abstract expressionism, Tachisme,
- Awards: Fulbright Fellowship 1952-1954; Chide Hassam Prize 1970; Proctor Prize 1976
- Patrons: Joseph H. Hirshhorn

Sarai Sherman (September 2, 1922 – October 24, 2013) was a Pennsylvania-born Jewish American artist whose work, both in America and Europe shaped international views of women and abstract expressionism. She was a significant twentieth century painter and sculptor known for her abstract paintings, prints and ceramics.

== Life and work ==
Sherman was born in the Germantown section of Philadelphia, Pennsylvania in 1922. She showed an early predisposition towards painting and was enrolled in an arts and graphics program around the age of 10. These early years began to shape her artistic interests in people, nature and the built environment. She attended Kensington High School and continued to explore artistic themes and painting. Sherman studied at the prestigious Barnes Foundation in Pennsylvania where she was exposed to seminal works of modern masters and she attended the Tyler School of Art at Temple University, headed at the time by Russian-born artist Boris Blai with faculty including Earl Horter and Honga Holm. Sherman graduated with a Bachelor of Fine Arts and a Bachelor of Science degree in education and then enrolled into the Master of Arts program at the University of Iowa, graduating with a degree in art history and painting. In 1948, at the age of 26 Sherman showed a painting titled “Hericane Time” at the Pyramid Club.

Sherman moved to New York City to pursue art. During this period she designed fabrics and wallpaper that were sold though stores in Philadelphia and New York. In a United Press International article published in June 1958 Sherman provided a glimpse into her textile and interior architectural design philosophy: "Designers must have a real sense about people and machines or they'll produce designs which are cultural lags. We must understand the American Women especially, and realize that she is in a state of transition."

During WWII, Sherman lived in Eagle Pass, Texas where her husband was stationed with the 45th Massachusetts Regiment.

=== Italy, 1952-1954 ===
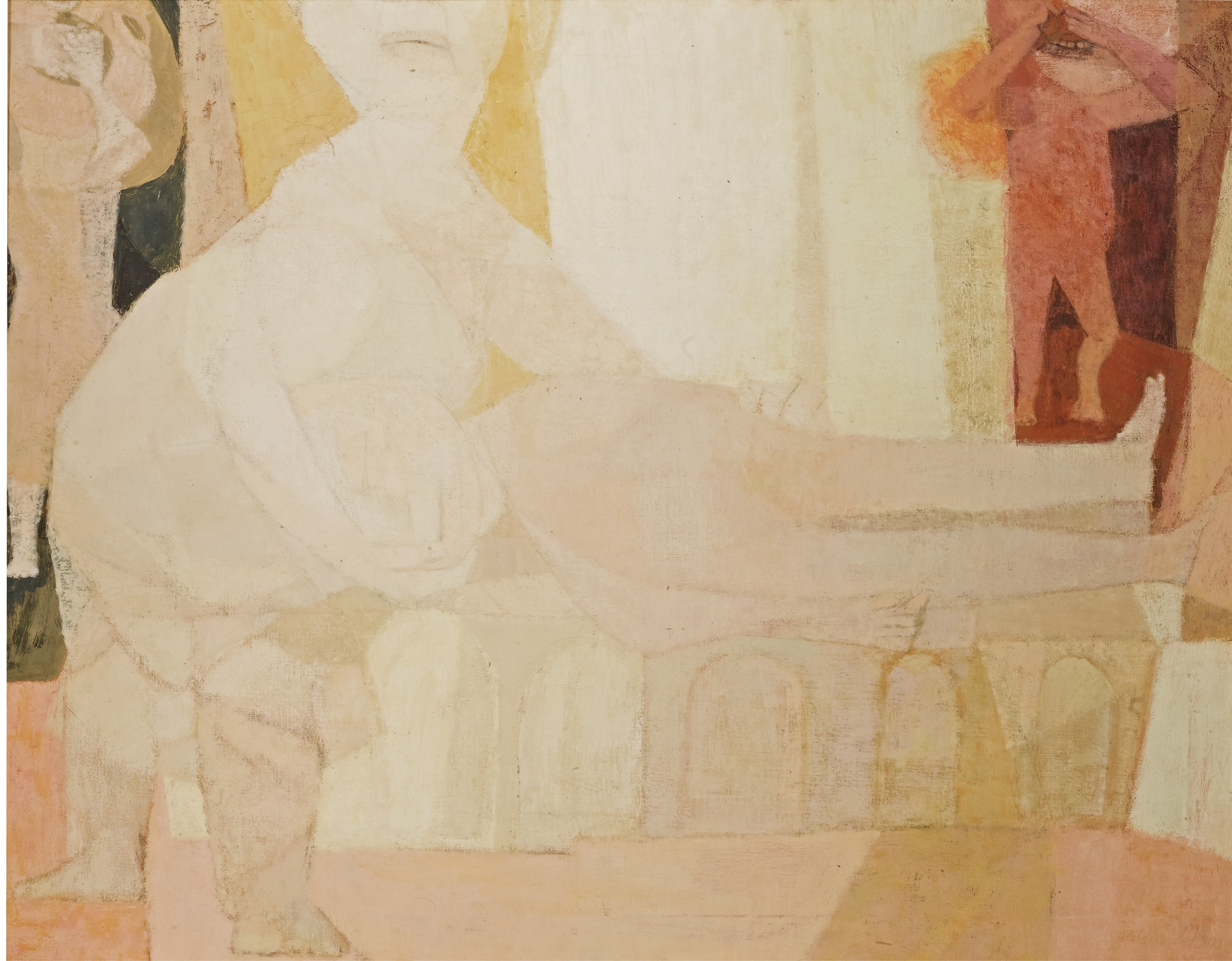
painting by Sarai Sherman

Sherman was awarded a Fulbright Grant to paint in Italy. There she gained a deep perspective into the poverty of postwar Europe. The experiences touched Sherman and became a turning point in her artistic development. For her, Italy became a platform from where she could look and participate in culture completely. She wrote from Matera in the Spring of 1953 "I feel at home...not because these caves remind me of Philadelphia, but because somehow a passage of light or color, or the motion of an animal, recall to my mind moments of my childhood, distant places. I feel as if it were my former self contemplating this forbidding white region. I see a woman with her child in her arms: His small body is in continuous motion, he looks around, he screams. I see mother and child in the sunlight, and it seems to me that I saw them years before, exhausted, yet beautiful. The old image is superimposed in the new one. The painting process is automatic, spontaneous, it leads me. The finished product is all chrome yellow, with ochre hues hovering between white and ivory. They reveal a sense of the ancient."

Sherman's conceptual ideas that were expressed in her painting were comparisons between reality and reminiscences, a compelling concern with the world of others, with the dejected southern Italian population and an identification of her own origin within that dejection and that poverty. During these years her art proceeded autobiographically, in the sense that, following an irrepressible necessity she identified with the subjects of her paintings. This period is full of symbolic content, the tenderness, the thoughtfulness of her paintings, which often become the moment of completion of an experience instead of simply leading to the discovery of new worlds of characters.

The exceptional episodic importance which was at the base of works done before 1955 becomes evident in the late 1950s. What used to be the figurative concentration of a tragedy becomes a portrayal of persons and things perceived in the midst of reality in fieri until the fleeting moment sets in.

=== 1955-1960 ===
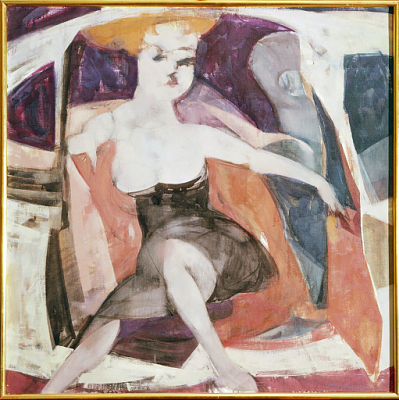
Baby Doll, 1957

From 1955 to 1960 Sherman worked in the United States. During this period, she amplified the typology and the background of her experiences, weighting the density of her painting. She retracted her steps from Picasso to the Impressionists. Like Francis Bacon, who after his surrealist Phicassian phase reverted to color painting, Sherman transferred onto her canvas a number of principles of the French masters of the late nineteenth century, filtered through schemes, vision and images, which were neither nineteenth century nor post-romantic in character, largely because internal plastic contradictions of the work and because of her awareness of the dimension of time. The ever-changing spectacle offered by the streets, are elements which have entered her fantasy by force, obliging her to move in a humble effort towards an increased objectivity, but which in the same act of reduction emerge more autobiographical then ever.

Sherman was a part of the emergency response to the 1966 flood of the Arno in Florence Italy. A group of international women artists called the “Flood Ladies” donated work to the city as a sign of solidarity following the Arno's catastrophic damage. The work donated to the city is now housed in the "Museum of the 1900s." As part of the 50th anniversary of the flooding, Sherman's work titled Icarus was one of 28 in a representative traveling exhibition and featured in the Book “When the World Answered” and the 2015 PBS documentary of the same name.

Sherman was represented by the ACA Galleries in New York throughout the 1950s and then by the Forum Gallery. Sherman has had numerous significant solo exhibitions throughout the United States and in Europe including the ACA Gallery, New York City (1951, 1955, 1958, 1960); Galleria La Nuova Pesa, Rome (1961), and Galleria Viotti, Turin (1963) – both in Italy; Forum Gallery, New York City (1963, 1967, 1970, 1974, 1986); Fairweather-Hardin Gallery, Chicago Illinois (1964); Museum of Contemporary Art, Skopje, Yugoslavia (1965); Galerie Weltz, Salzburg, Austria and Salon Tribune Mladih, Novi Sad, Yugoslavia (1966); Galleria dell’Orso, Milan (1973), and Studio 5, Bologna (1976) – both in Italy; Madison Gallery, Toronto Canada (1976); Galleria Giulia, Rome, Italy (1982).

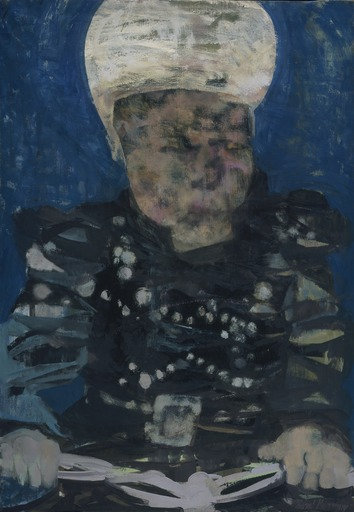
Bear Cat, 1957

Sherman created numerous lithographs and prints. Many of these editioned works were produced at the renowned atelier Il Bisonte in Florence who also produced significant works for Henry Moore and Pablo Picasso.

Sherman won numerous awards and prizes for her work including a Pepsi Cola award (1945), Fulbright Foundation fellowship to Italy (1952-1954), a painting award from the American Academy and Institute of Arts and Letters, New York City (1964) and their Childe Hassam Prize (1970); in addition to many medals, citations and prizes in exhibitions throughout Italy and the Proctor Prize, National Academy of Design, New York City (1976).

== Style and influences ==
Sherman's major, and critically acclaimed, work produced in Italy during the mid 1950 was focused on the sun drenched settings, people and post World War II milieu of Southern Italy. The tonal and ethereal quality of her paintings from this period capture the arid colors and blinding light of the Mezzogiorno.

Mario Penelope recalled in his 1983 essay on Sherman titled Coherence And Reality: "a group of paintings done during that first stay which were exhibited in nineteen hundred and fifty five in her first Roman one-person show at the Zodiac Gallery. In these canvases there were images of women, children, and sharecroppers; portrayed austerely in their most typical attitudes in a strange archaic manner. They seemed encamped with weighted solemmity in a timeless spatiality; in an understated drama of transcendent sadness which laid bare with bitter emotion the dark pathetic solitude of that sharecropper world. Shapes and forms were conceived within a rigorous formal scheme. These shapes were layered into a rhythm of concrete volumes in which at intervals the profound sense of the value of color soberly restrained filtered through. Forms were emphasized by a concise pre-meditated linear drawing in which there were residual suggestions of the lesson of Picasso and Cubism".

The Italian art critic Duilio Morosini framed Sherman in an artistic and cultural context in her 1977 essay for the book Sarai Sherman. Morosini wrote that one needs now to place “Sherman in a historical relationship to other exponents of American critical realism, both of the first and second generation. The major recurring theme of an isolated urban solitude (expressed by an standardization of choices, in personal ideals and practical solutions, and hence the disappearance of feeling and communication) is not seen by this artist as a grievous meditation of the state of things where nothing can be achieved, as one sees in Edward Hopper’s revealing objectivism; nor is it an irascible accusation as in the post war II revival of expressionism. In her painting (not only the earlier period from 1954 to 1965, but in all her developments) the characters do not rely upon indicative details, rather upon the “whole” with its resolute “aura” (inherent in such pictorialization of the thought imagery). The projection of light in the painting in which every presence, every act seems to be caught in an equivocal transition between day and night or vice versa; in other words, in the inquietude and expectation of an unpredictable change.”

“In Sherman’s work there is a consistent involvement with a visualization of distorted values in the continuum of social generalization. During 1962 she completed a series of large composition paintings that focused on the death of the matrix of post World War II sex symbols. The capacity of Sherman to use the ambivalence inherent in metaphorical values, as a springboard in the employ of tonal color, immersed in diffused light has also made it possible to retain a sensitivity towards a younger generation’s milieu. Her work in the 1970s reflected a shift in the pictorialization of generalized meanings; a constantly precarious situation for all painters of Sherman’s generations.”

Overarching themes in Sherman's work focused on concerns with humankind's inhumanity to one another, where form and content are one.

=== Ceramics ===
Sherman began exploring three-dimensional form in ceramic sculpture in the early 1980s. The contemplative work from this period presents serne animal and human forms to the viewers gaze. The organic sensual shapes evoke or are explicitly feminine in form. The tactile and often delicate porcelain work were metaphorical juxtapositions of fundamental dualities: peace and war, life and death.

=== Guzzetti Chapel (Cappella Guzzetti), Camera Picta, Cortona Italia ===
Between 1987 and 1994 Sherman created major site-specific fresco and altarpiece commission in Cortona, Italy for the Guzzetti Chapel on the grounds of the Villa Corono. The fresco cycle called Camera Picta are painted on the walls of the 18th-century building owned by the Italian art patrons the Guzzettis. The allegorical work focus on the biblical and secular themes including sheep, bucolic landscape and flora. The paintings are saturated in muted tones and soft umber, ochre and cream colors that recall her work of the 1950s. The full commission included paintings, sculpture and architectural trompe-l'œil. The altar-piece, (1992-1994) utilizes three-dimensional ceramic forms, a rendering of sheep in repetition as biblical symbolism.

== Legacy ==
Sherman's work is included in numerous private and public permanent collections including the Museum of Modern Art (MoMA) New York; the Whitney Museum of Art, New York; Syracuse University; Hirshhorn Museum and Sculpture Garden, Washington, DC; the National Gallery of Modern Art in Rome; the Uffizi Gallery, Florence, Italy; Sconci Art Gallery, Dubai; Jerusalem Museum, Israel; National Gallery of Modern Art, Bratislava, Czechoslovakia; International Museum of Modern Art, Skopje, Yugoslavia; Gramsci Museum, Ghilarza, Sardinia.

Sherman died in New York City on October 24, 2013.

== Awards ==
- 1949 Pepsi Cola Award, USA
- 1952 Fulbright Grant in Painting, Italy
- 1964 Award for Painting, National Institute of Arts and Letters, New York, USA
- 1964 Premio Cecina, Italy
- 1965 Premio Resistenza, Pistoia
- 1965 Premio San Giovanni (Gold medal from the President of the Senate)
- 1967 Premio Marzotto (Special Citation)
- 1969 Premio Acireale (Silver Medal)
- 1970 Childe Hassan Purchase Prize, National Institute of Arts and Letters, New York, USA
- 1975 Premio San Marino, Republic of San Marino
- 1976 Proctor Prize, National Academy of Design, New York.

== Selected group exhibitions ==
- 1949 Whitney Museum of Art, New York, Annual Exhibitions of Contemporary American Painting
- 1950 Whitney Museum of Art, New York, Annual Exhibitions of Contemporary American Painting
- 1952 Art Institute of Chicago, Contemporary Drawings From 12 Countries 1946 -1952
- 1953 Brooklyn Museum, New York, 17th Biennial.
- 1955 Whitney Museum of Art, New York, Annual Exhibitions of Contemporary American Painting
- 1958 Smithsonian Institution, Washington DC, Fulbright Painters
- 1959 Whitney Museum of Art, Annual Exhibitions of Contemporary American Painting
- 1960 Museum of Modern Art, New York, New Acquisitions
- 1962 Whitney Museum of Art, New York, Forty Artists Under Forty
- 1963 Whitney Museum of Art, New York, Annual Exhibitions of Contemporary American Painting
- 1971 Whitney Museum of Art, New York, Biennial of Painting
- 1971 Women in the Whitney, Museum of American Art, New York
- 1971 Contemporary Italian Graphics, Museum of Modern Art, Haifa and Ein Harod Neghev, Israel
- 1972 Grafica di Oggi, International Biennal of Venice
- 1974 Rassegna Internazionale d'Arte Presente, Rebubblica Amalfitana
- 1974 International Portraiture, Albissola
- 1975 Museum of Modern Art, New York, A Museum Menagerie
- 1975 Arte Fano
- 1975 Contemporary Graphics, Language and Generations in Confrontation, Vicenza
- 1976 National Academy of Design Painting Annual, New York
- 1976 Museum Menagerie, Museum of Modern Art, New York
- 1977 International Biennal of Premio Fiorino, Strozzi Palace, Florence
- 2016 MAGI900 Museo d'arte, Women at Work, Bologna, Italy

== Selected solo exhibitions 1950-1965 ==
- 1951 ACA Gallery, New York, New York
- 1955 ACA Gallery, New York, New York
- 1955 Galleria dello Zodizco, Rome, Italy
- 1958 ACA Gallery, New York, New York
- 1960 ACA Gallery, New York, New York
- 1961 Galleria delle Ore, Milan, Italy
- 1961 Galleria La Nuova Pesa, Rome, Italy
- 1963 Galleria La Polena, Genoa, Italy
- 1963 Galleria delle Ore, Milan, Italy
- 1963 Galleria Viotti, Turin, Italy
- 1963 Forum Gallery, New York, New York
- 1963 Gallery Penelope, Rome, Italy
- 1963 Galleria L'Incontro, Salerno, Italy
- 1964 Galleria Lerici, Carrara, Italy
- 1964 Fairweather-Hardin Gallery, Chicago Illinois
- 1964 Galleria Il Sedile, Lecce, Italy
- 1964 Galleria Il Portico, Reggio Emilia
- 1964 Gallery Penelope, Rome, Italy
- 1964 Galleria L'Incontro, Taranto, Italy
- 1965 Galleria Trentadue, Milan, Italy
- 1965 Museum of Contemporary Art, Skopje

== Published portfolios ==
- 1964 The Bachae, Ed. Il Bisonte, Florence. Delphic Press, New York.
- 1966 The Song of Songs, Ed. Penelope Gallery, Delphic Press, New York.
- 1969 Folk Rock, Blues and Flower Children, Ed. Grafica Romero, Rome.
- 1973 The Garden of Eden, Ed. Stamperia Dell'Orso, Raffaele Bandini, Milan
- 1975 Nature Viva, Ed. Raffaele Bandini, Milan (text by Carlo Bernari)

== Museum collections ==
- Museum of Modern Art, New York
- Whitney Museum of American Art, New York
- National Gallery of Modern Art, Rome
- National Academy Museum, New York
- Syracuse University, Syracuse, New York
- University of Nebraska Art Galleries, Lincoln, Nebraska
- Oklahoma Art Center, Oklahoma City, Oklahoma
- Collection of the University of Iowa, Iowa City
- Collection of Temple University, Philadelphia
- Hobart Museum, Syracuse, New York
- Collection of Modern Art, Southern Methodist University, Dallas, Texas
- Chrysler Museum (Provincetown, Massachusetts)|Chrysler Museum, Provincetown, Massachusetts
- Jerusalem Museum, Israel
- International Museum of Contemporary Art, Florence
- Hirshhorn Museum, Smithsonian Institution, Washington D.C.
- Institute of International Studies Collection, New York
- Collection of Modern Art, Fairleigh
- Dickerson University, New Jersey
- Drawing and Graphics Collection, Uffizzi Gallery, Florence
- Graphic Archive, Library of Palazzo, Venezia, Rome
- Gallery of Modern Art, Republic of San Marino
- National Gallery of Modern Art, Bratislava
- National Gallery of Modern Art, Rome
- International Museum of Modern Art, Skopje
- International Museum of Modern Art, Florence
- Gramsci Museum, Ghilarza, Sardinia
- Wichita Art Museum, Wichita, Kansas
- Museum of the 1900s, Florence, Italy

== Documentary film ==
- Painting Like Life, 1969, Rome. Prod: Patara; Director, Milla Pastorino
- Sarai Sherman - Painting, 1971/76/77. Rome. Prod. Di Ciaula, Director, Libero Bizzarri
