= San Cristoforo, Cortona =

Church in Cortona, Italy

Coordinates: 43.2764°N 11.9897°E

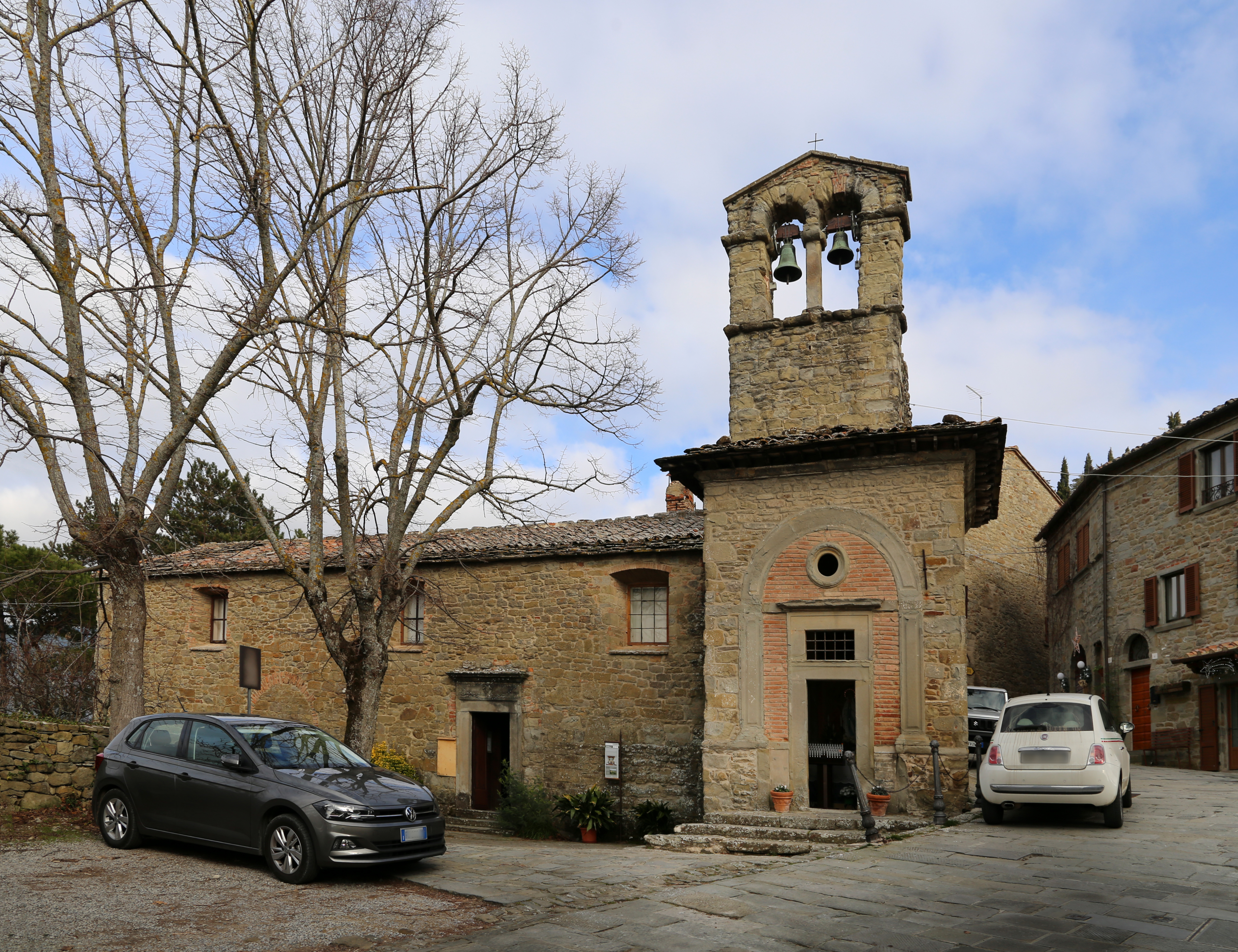
San Cristoforo Facade and bell-tower, with portal-entry set off to the right of the nave.

San Cristoforo is a small, Roman Catholic church located at the intersection of Via San Niccolò and Via dell’Orto della Cera, in central Cortona, Province of Arezzo, region of Tuscany in Italy.

== History ==
Documents date a church at the site from 1192, but much of the church was rebuilt in 1575 after a fire, and modified over the centuries. The rustic facade is awkwardly place relative to the nave. In the apse, some 14th-century frescoes still survive, depicting the Crucifixion, the Annunciation, the Ascension, and Christ blessing with Angels. The brick roof structure that holds the bells was built in the 15th century. The interior contains a restored 19th-century organ by Giovanni Banci.
