= Convent de Le Celle, Cortona =

Franciscan convent in Tuscany, Italy

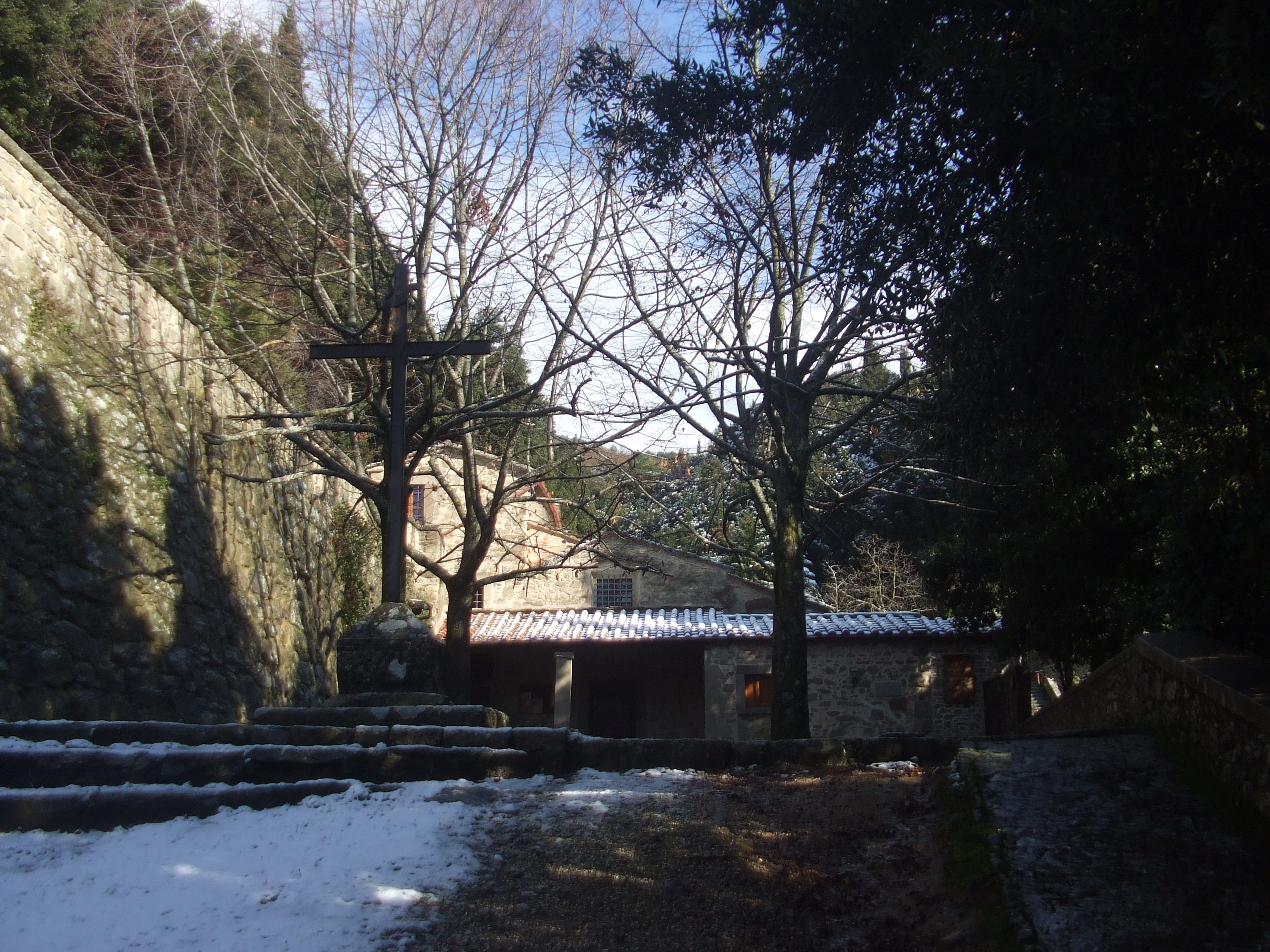
Convent de let Celle

The Convent de Le Celle is a 13th-century Franciscan convent located in Le Celle, just outside Cortona, region of Tuscany, Italy. It is also referred to as the Convento delle Celle or Eremo Le Celle.

A small hermitage was erected here in circa 1211 or 1221, and it briefly housed St Francis of Assisi himself in his lifetime. In 1235, Brother Elias of Cortona, Minister general of the Franciscans at the death of the founder, erected a sanctuary, refectory and five monk cells (rooms) of similar size to the one that Francis himself had used. Monks remained at the site for nearly a century, then the monastery was almost abandoned.

The structures passed to the parish and were occupied by the Order of Friars Minor Capuchin monks in 1537, who dedicated the church to the St Michael Archangel. This order was dedicated to a more eremitic lifestyle befitting this rural site. In 1634, the church was rededicated to St Antony of Padua. From 1804 to 1811, the Napoleonic government expelled the monks. They returned later in the 19th century.

The rustic stone buildings nestle in terraces on a mountain-side with a holly oOak and cypress grove. The main convent is accessed through a stone pedestrian bridge spanning a small spring stream. The church has a few ancient works, but many of the present artwork is modern. The Capuchin order is presently associated with the site, and manages the site as a rustic retreat for visitors interested in prayer and meditation.
