= Spirito Santo, Cortona =

Church in Tuscany, Italy

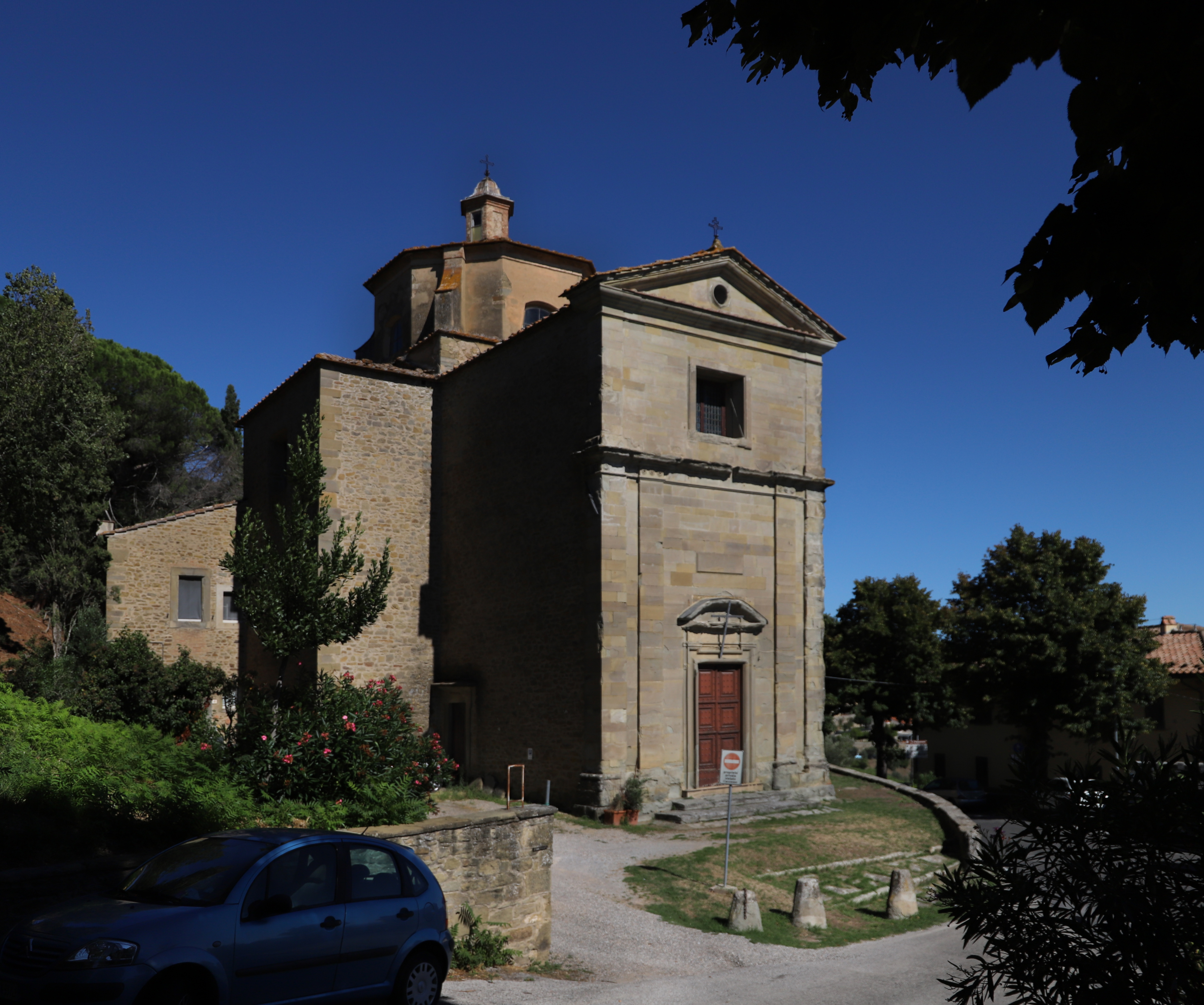
The church Chiesa dello Spirito Santo

The Church of the Holy Spirit or Chiesa dello Spirito Santo is a 17th-century, Roman Catholic church built just outside the medieval walls of Cortona, region of Tuscany, Italy.

== History ==
The site had previously housed an aedicule with a miraculous icon of the Virgin. Construction of the church took place between 1637 and 1669 using designs by Filippo Berrettini. The church was occupied by priests of the order of the Congregation of St Elizabeth. The dome and the tall facade were completed in 1751.

An inventory in 1900 described the main altar and the sculptures are the work of Francesco Fabbrucci (1687–1767), who also created the statues of Faith and Charity, which are copies of the statues by Bernini on the tomb of Pope Urban VIII. On this altar there is an image of the Virgin Mary, while on the left side altar there is a canvas with the Madonna with Saints Margaret and Felici pray for souls in Purgatory by Angiolo Ricci. In the altar on the right is a canvas depicting the Madonna with Infant Jesus, Santa Margherita and San Felice by Giuseppe Angeli.
