= Crucifixion with Mourners and St Dominic =

c. 1435 painting by Fra Angelico

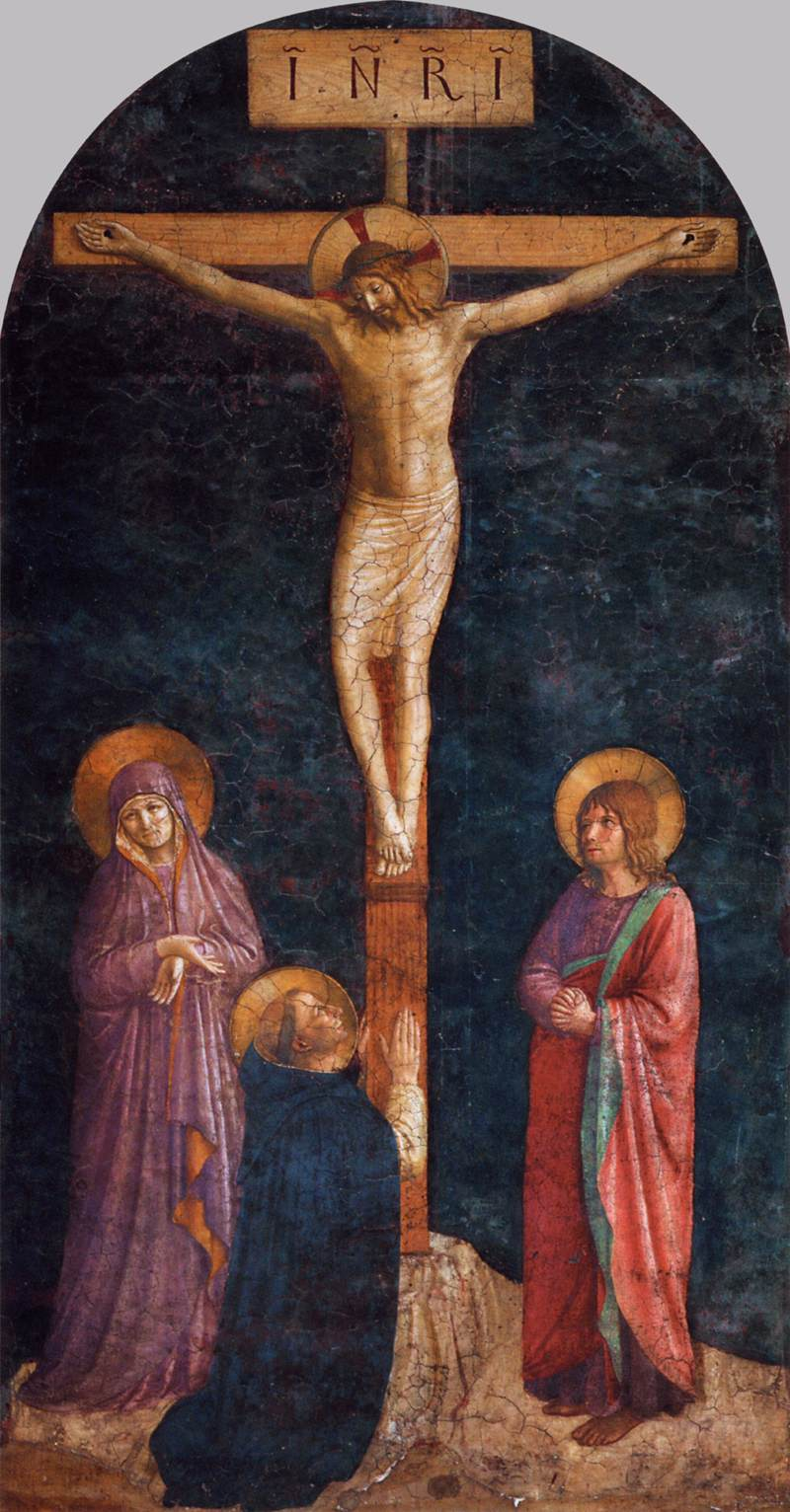
Crucifixion with Mourners and St Dominic (c. 1436) by Fra Angelico

Crucifixion with Mourners and St Dominic is a fresco fragment by the Italian early Renaissance painter Fra Angelico, executed c. 1435, from the refectory of the Convent of San Domenico, Fiesole, now in the Louvre.

Like the same artist's Coronation of the Virgin from the same convent, it was removed and taken to France after it was suppressed under the Napoleonic occupation. After the Bourbon Restoration, it was one of around a hundred works not to be returned to Italy, nominally due to their dimensions and the difficulties of transporting them.

Christ is shown with his head leaning on his chest (possibly developing studies from below of Masaccio's Pisa Crucifixion). At the centre is Saint Dominic, with the Virgin Mary and John the Evangelist either side of the cross.
