= Guzzetti Chapel =

Church in Cortona, Italy

The Guzzetti Chapel (Italian: Cappella Guzzetti) was built in the 18th century and is located on the grounds of the Cortona's Villa delle Contesse (Corona Villa) in Cortona, Italy in Tuscany. It contains a fresco cycle and altarpiece by Jewish-American Artist Sarai Sherman, completed between 1987 and 1994 called Camera Picta. It is a masterpiece of twentieth-century Western art.

== Building and frescos ==
The Guzzetti Chapel was originally built as a barn in the 18th century. It is a simple rectangular chamber divided by two pilasters placed against each wall, and by two corresponding columns that are eighteen inches in diameter. The Corinthian capitals support a fluted pediment, creating a sort of Serliana which, rather than demarcating a presbytery, serves to divide the space reserved for the nobility from that of the servants and peasants. Between the low cross vaulted ceiling and the lintel, a small pediment or tympanum is barely visible, a curious structural and ornamental gesture for a classically trained mason. The tympanum uses a repetition of one that property appears on the far wall and is supported by two relief pilasters that extend from the top of the altar and once framed a now absent altarpiece.

Sherman was commissioned and over numerous years (1987–1994) painted and decorated the chapel with secular metaphors dealing centrally with biological disequilibrium and celestial glory rendered earthly.

The triangular space enclosed by the tympanum is painted a sky blue which tints the huge eye of god at its center. Far from suggesting the biblical, or staring into the consciences of men, this eye of a Zeus or Pan serenely surveys the life that surrounds it as the discreet master of the world.

The three panel framed by the pilasters have been filled in with a matrix of tiles in unpainted bas relief, each portraying a kneeling sheep in either a left or right profile, in a free play of combinations. In the center, sculpted on a large slab is a group of six rams standing together. It is as if Sherman has used a movie camera to zoom in on the center of this geometric flock, obscuring a section of the “long shot” with a closeup.

Sherman creates a relationship between the original function of the chapel and the function to which she has imbued into her art. The scenes depicted, their unfolding, their plastic relationship to each other, implies an almost unconscious sense of the sacred. The work is a personal act of liberation.

== Context ==
The mural cycle on the walls of the Guzzetti Chapel was a complex endeavor. The name "Camera Picta" means "painted chamber," and the work covers all four walls of the space. The work is rooted in an Italian fresco tradition. The work is visually related to the composite fictions of Pompeian painting, the iconography of the Renaissance of Florence and Mantua, and to that of Piero’s choir in the church of San Francesco in Arezzo, yet entirely original transcending the ossification and limitations of easel painting to bring new life to a rich tradition, creating a work with both immediate and historical validity.

== Villa Corona and garden ==
The Guzzetti Chapel is sited on the grounds of the Villa Corona ensconced in the Etruscan citadel of Corthona, a rich fertile landscape of olive trees, orchards, and vineyards. The villa is typical of estate homes in Tuscany, Italy. The original construction date of the villa is unknown but the house has grown over numerous centuries to its present form at the end of the 19th century. The villa is a simple, rectangular building painted yellow ochre. Behind the villa is the chapel which was reconstructed from an earlier structure of rough masonry. The chapel is reached through a private park and garden, which mirror the buildings in the superimposed levels of development. The garden includes a Guelph tower and an ornamental grotto rebuilt first at the end of the 18th century, and again at the beginning of the 19th century. The garden features terracotta statues, urns and ornaments dell’ Impruneta. The garden’s archetype is the garden at Selvazzano near Padua. The Selvazzano garden was conceived in the second half of the 17th century by a noted literary figure Melchiorre Cesarotti. She defined it as his poem “vegetale” and is lost.

== Legacy ==
As described in the publication Camera Picta Alberto Busignani wrote: “Sherman approached these bare, plastered walls, whose surface is broken only by two small windows facing the valley and framing a fragment of the landscape. She began the process of reinterpreting the realities of this landscape and painted them panel by panel, creating with we have termed her microcosm. The works come to reflect the outside viewed through the filters of the artist’s consciousness, her experiences and a sensibility crystallized by the events and the tensions of Sherman’s lifelong artistic experience. In the analysis, the same sensibility that led Sherman to undertake this unusual project evokes in the viewer a simple and independent visceral response.” The chapel, paintings and gardens are extensively photographed and detailed in the book and three dimensional fold out publication by Roland Bellini.
