= San Domenico, Cortona =

Church in Cortona

Coordinates: 43.27°N 11.99°E

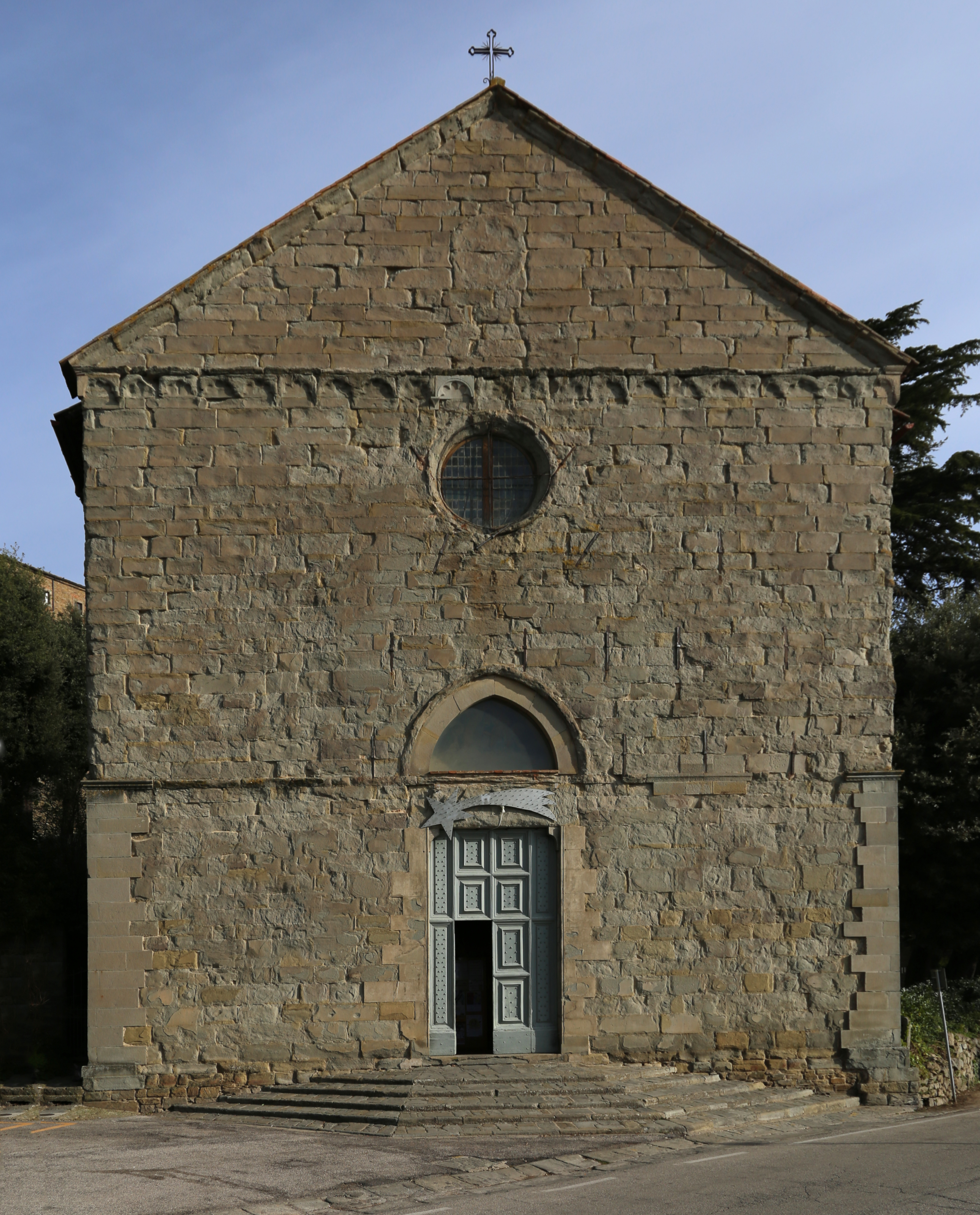
The facade of the church San Domenico in Cortona

San Domenico is a Gothic-style, Roman Catholic church located on via Berrettini in Cortona, region of Tuscany, Italy.

== History ==
A convent and a small church were built here beginning in 1230, but after new land adjacent to these structures was acquired, the new church we see today was completed in 1438. The complex was built outside the walls of the time, near where once stood the Porta Peccioverardi. A major refurbishment occurred in the 1590s.

The Dominican convent was suppressed by the Grand-Duke's edict in 1786, and the convent was occupied by the Servites until their suppression in 1800. The church fell into disrepair, and most of the convent was destroyed to build new roads in 1817-1819.

The unfinished grey stone brick facade with a peaked portal and a single small oculus leads into a well organized interior nave with elaborate side altars. In the lunette over the doorway there is a fresco by Fra Angelico, depicting the Madonna and child with Saints Dominic and Peter Martyr. Fra Angelico once lived in the monastery.

The main altarpiece is a triptych by Lorenzo di Niccolò of Florence, depicting the Coronation of the Virgin, the Annunciation, the Crucifixion, and other scenes. Epigraphs and signatures on the work document the painter and that it was donated in 1440 by Cosimo I de' Medici.

Some of the lateral altarpieces have been moved to the Diocesan Museum, and occasionally re-placed at their original sites. On the left is a Madonna with Angels and Franciscan Saints by Luca Signorelli. A triptych by Sassetta and an Assumption by Bartolomeo della Gatta can now be admired in the Diocesan Museum.
