= Under the Tuscan Sun (film) =

2003 film by Audrey Wells

- Theatrical release poster
- Directed by: Audrey Wells
- Screenplay by: Audrey Wells
- Story by: Audrey Wells
- Based on: Under the Tuscan Sun by Frances Mayes
- Produced by: Tom Sternberg; Audrey Wells
- Starring: Diane Lane; Sandra Oh; Lindsay Duncan; Raoul Bova
- Cinematography: Geoffrey Simpson
- Edited by: Arthur Coburn; Andrew Marcus; Todd E Miller
- Music by: Christophe Beck
- Production company: Touchstone Pictures
- Distributed by: Buena Vista Pictures Distribution
- Release date: September 26, 2003 (United States)
- Running time: 113 minutes
- Country: United States
- Languages: English; Italian
- Budget: $18 million
- Box office: $58.9 million

Under the Tuscan Sun is a 2003 American romantic comedy-drama written, produced, and directed by Audrey Wells and starring Diane Lane.

Based on Frances Mayes's 1996 memoir of the same name, the film is about a recently divorced writer who buys a villa in Tuscany on a whim, hoping it will lead to a change in her life.

The film was released in the US on September 26th, 2003, did moderately well at the box office and was predominantly well-received by critics.

== Plot ==
Frances Mayes is a San Francisco writer whose seemingly perfect life takes an unexpected turn when she inadvertently learns that her husband has been cheating on her. The husband, who had been working on his writing and had no income, ironically, was allowed to petition for alimony. As a one-time settlement, however, the agreement was for Frances to quitclaim her 1/2 ownership of the home.

The divorce—and the loss of her house to her ex-husband and his much-younger, pregnant new partner—leaves Frances depressed and unable to write. Her best friend Patti, who is expecting a child with her girlfriend Grace, is worried that Frances might never recover from the traumatic divorce. She urges Frances to take an Italian vacation to Tuscany using the ticket she purchased before she became pregnant. At first, Frances refuses, but after another depressing day in her gloomy temporary apartment, she decides that it is a good idea to get away for a while.

In Tuscany, Frances' tour group stops in the small town of Cortona. After wandering through the charming streets, Frances notices a posting for a villa for sale in Cortona. She rejoins her tour group on the bus, and just outside town, the bus stops to allow a flock of sheep to cross the road.

While they wait, Frances realizes that they have stopped directly in front of the very villa that she had seen for sale—something she believes is a sign. She asks the driver to stop, and she gets off the bus. Through a series of serendipitous events, Frances becomes the owner of a lovely yet dilapidated villa in beautiful Tuscany.

Frances begins her new life with the help of a variety of interesting characters and unusual but gentle souls. She hires a crew of Polish immigrants to renovate the house. Over time, Frances also befriends her Italian neighbors and develops relationships with her Polish workers, the realtor who sold her the villa, and Katherine, an eccentric aging British actress who evokes the mystery and beauty of an Italian film star. Later, she is visited by the now very pregnant Patti, whose partner Grace has left her.

Frances meets and has a brief romantic affair with Marcello, but their relationship does not last. She is about to give up on happiness when one of her Polish workers, a teenager named Pawel, and a neighbor's young daughter come to her for help. Her father does not approve of him, due to his being Polish and not having a family, yet they are very much in love and want to get married. Frances persuades the girl's family to support their love, by proclaiming that she is Pawel's family, and the young lovers are soon married at the villa.

During the wedding celebration, Ed, an American writer appears unexpectedly. The writer, whose novel Frances had previously edited and critiqued harshly, is traveling in Tuscany and heard about her residence there. Their attraction for each other points to a romantic future.

== Cast ==
- Diane Lane as Frances Mayes
- Sandra Oh as Patti
- Lindsay Duncan as Katherine
- Raoul Bova as Marcello
- Vincent Riotta as Martini
- Mario Monicelli as Old Man with Flowers
- Claudia Gerini as Signora Raguzzi
- Giulia Steigerwalt as Chiara
- Pawel Szajda as Pawel
- Anita Zagaria as Fiorella
- Roberto Nobile as Placido
- Valentine Pelka as Jerzy
- Sasa Vulicevic as Zbigniew
- Dan Bucatinsky as Rodney
- David Sutcliffe as Ed
- Kate Walsh as Grace
- Don McManus as Nasty Man
- Evelina Gori as Nona Cardinale
- Massimo Sarchielli as Nino
- Laura Pestellini as Contessa
- Matt Salinger as colleague
- Elden Henson as author
- Jack Kehler as apartment manager
- Kristoffer Winters as David, the tour guide
- Nuccio Siano as Gianni
- Malva Guicheney as Gianni's daughter
- Jeffrey Tambor as lawyer (uncredited)

== Production ==
=== Development ===
In November 1998, producer Tom Sternberg was filming the psychological thriller The Talented Mr. Ripley (1999) in Northern Italy. In the penultimate week of its seventeen-week shooting schedule, the crew was working in the Tuscan town of Pienza in the province of Siena. After finishing the shooting day, Sternberg, director Anthony Minghella and actor Matt Damon met Frances Mayes and her husband Ed at a nearby wine bar where the couple was picking out wine glasses. Astounded to meet the author, Sternberg had read Mayes's 1996 memoir Under the Tuscan Sun a year earlier but initially not considered it for film treatment. In March 2000, Sternberg met Mayes again in Los Angeles, where they were guests of the Tuscan Film Commission. Upon their reencounter, Sternberg reread the book and realized its potential as a film. Sternberg and executive producer Mark Gill gave the book to Audrey Wells and asked to hear her take on how to adapt it for the screen. Wells envisioned Under The Tuscan Sun to be a "lush, classical romantic comedy whose point is that if you stop looking for love, love will find you."

=== Filming locations ===
- Banca CR Firenze, Cortona, Tuscany, Italy (interiors, bank scene)
- Cassa di Risparmio di Firenze, Cortona, Tuscany, Italy (real estate transaction scene with a judicial scrivener)
- Teatro Signorelli, Cortona, Italy (movie date with Pawel)
- Cinecittà Studios, Cinecittà, Rome, Lazio, Italy (bookstore, Patti & Grace's San Francisco apartment)
- Cortona, Arezzo, Tuscany, Italy
- Florence, Tuscany, Italy
- Montepulciano, Siena, Tuscany, Italy (leaving Cortona, wedding)
- Positano, Salerno, Campania, Italy
- Rome, Lazio, Italy
- Borgo De Celli, Umbria, Italy
- San Francisco, California, United States
- Montepulciano, Tuscany, Italy (flag-waving show)
- Teatro Signorelli, Cortona, Arezzo, Tuscany, Italy (interiors)

== Reception ==
=== Box office ===
Under the Tuscan Sun grossed $43.6 million in the United States and Canada, and $15.3 million in other territories, for a worldwide total of $58.9 million. In the United States and Canada, the film grossed $9.7 million from 1,226 theaters on its opening weekend, ranking second behind The Rundown.

=== Critical response ===
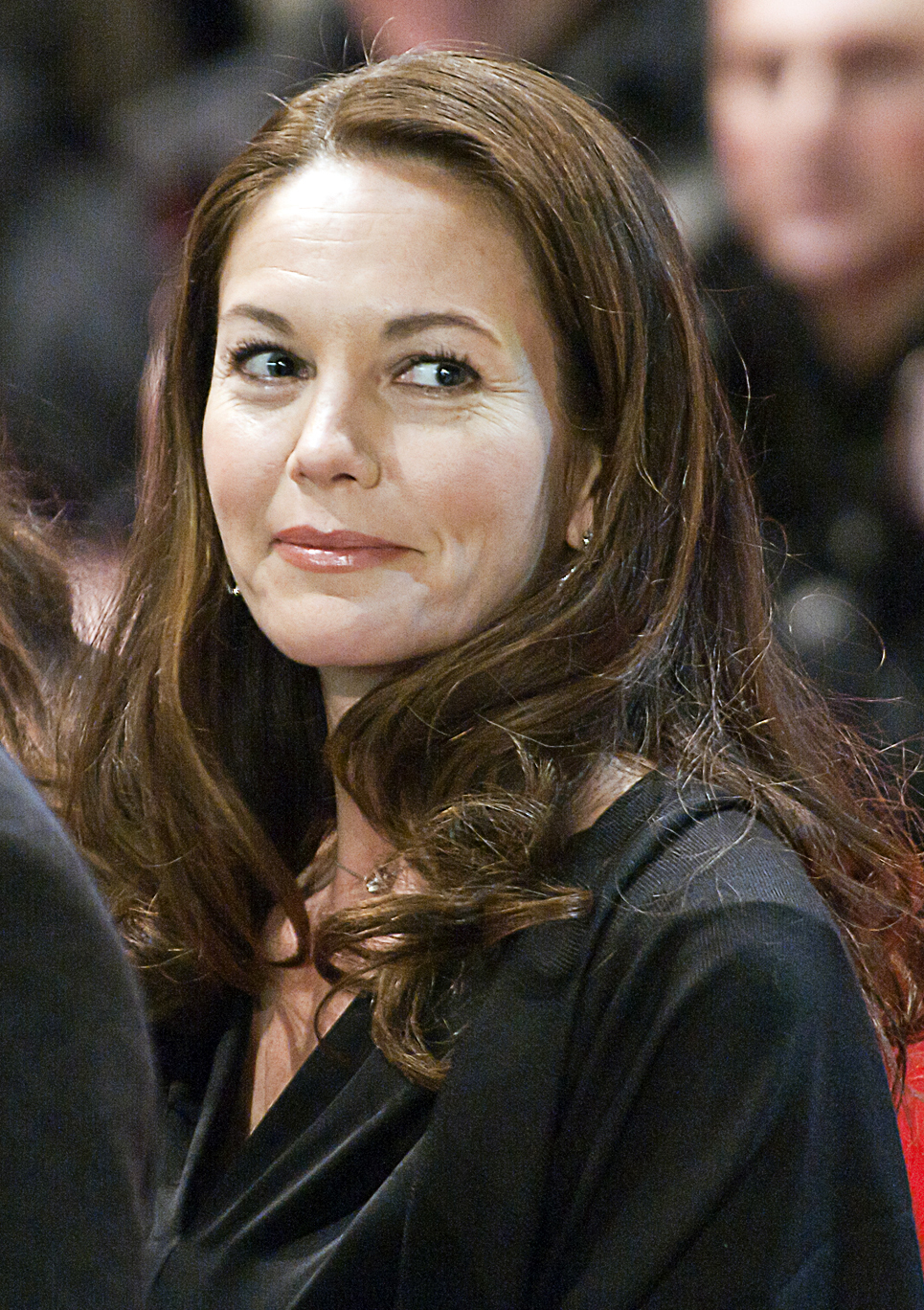
Diane Lane's performance received high praise from critics, earning her a nomination for the Golden Globe Award for Best Actress in a Motion Picture – Musical or Comedy.

The film received mixed reviews from critics, although there was strong praise for Lane's performance. On the review aggregator website Rotten Tomatoes, the film holds an approval rating of 62% based on 155 reviews, with an average score of 6.2/10. The website's critics consensus reads, "Though formulaic and superficial, Under the Tuscan Sun is redeemed by Lane's vibrant performance." Metacritic, which uses a weighted average, assigned the film a score of 52 out of 100, based on 35 critics, indicating "mixed or average" reviews.

Mick LaSalle of the San Francisco Chronicle remarked that "it would be easy [...] to call the entire plot of Under the Tuscan Sun a mere excuse to show us beautiful things and Lane's reaction to them. [But] despite stiff competition from the natural surroundings, Lane's face is not just the witness to beauty but also the thing itself in this stunning-looking film." Roger Ebert, writing for the Chicago Sun-Times, gave Under the Tuscan Sun three out of four stars. He called the film an "alluring example of yuppie porn, seducing audiences with a shapely little villa in Italy [...] What redeems the film is its successful escapism, and Lane's performance." Similarly, Boston Globe's Ty Burr found that Under the Tuscan Sun "plays as a warmly soothing yuppie-makeover daydream, and it goes down like limoncello – sweet, not very good for you, but irresistible just the same."

Mike Clark from USA Today declared the film "a fun movie to sit through even when you don't always buy it [...] If the scenery and Lane's charm hook you early on, you'll probably go with the flow. And the movie is all Lane." Seattle Times critic Moira MacDonald felt that "despite the formulaic plot, which seems to belong on the Lifetime channel, Wells has a knack for witty dialogue that keeps things moving along [...] As escapism and as winsome travelogue, Under the Tuscan Sun works just fine." Rex Reed, writing for The New York Observer was critical with the film's overplotted third act, but added: "File [it] under guilty pleasures, but I loved [the film] unconditionally [...] The epitome of what a feel-good movie is supposed to be but rarely is, this one is beautiful to look at and life-affirming to think about, and it doesn't have a pretentious bone in its head."

In her review for Salon, Stephanie Zacharek was more cutting, saying: "For a movie about moving to Italy and bedding a hot Italian stallion, this sterile fantasy is about as sexy as a rusty olive oil can [...] Under the Tuscan Sun pretends to be juicy, but it doesn't allow any dribbles. It purports to make love all over us, but not without laying down lots of paper towels first." Lisa Schwarzbaum of Entertainment Weekly graded the film with a 'C+' rating, summarizing it as a "a golden vise of women's romance-pic clichés." Los Angeles Times critic Manohla Dargis wrote that "it's a pleasure to watch Lane's delicately lived-in face tremble with feeling – it's the truest thing in the movie – but the character's desperation feels wrong, the worst kind of sellout [...] The movie pretends it's peddling a vision of 'you-go-girl' independence in which it doesn't remotely believe."

=== Accolades ===
List of awards and nominations
Award	Category	Recipient(s)	Result
ADG Excellence in Production Design Awards	Contemporary Film	Stephen McCabe	Nominated
GLAAD Media Awards	Outstanding Film – Wide Release	Under the Tuscan Sun	Nominated
Golden Globe Award	Best Actress – Motion Picture Comedy or Musical	Diane Lane	Nominated
Golden Satellite Award	Best Actress – Musical or Comedy	Diane Lane	Nominated
Hollywood Makeup Artist and Hair Stylist Guild Awards	Best Contemporary Hair Styling - Feature	Candy L. Walken	Nominated

== See also ==
- Under the Tuscan Sun, the memoir on which the film is based
