= Liliana Cossovel =

Italian artist

Liliana Cossovel (1924–1984) was an Italian artist specializing in abstract painting and collage.

== Early life ==
Liliana Cossovel was born in 1924 in Gorizia and died in 1984 in Venice. In 1948, she moved to Venice to study painting and architecture at the Accademia di Pittura.

== Artistic activity ==
She held several shows within Italy, and exhibited internationally at the Exhibition of Italian Design in Washington DC (1955), the biennial in San Marino (1960), the 1963 Biennial of Graphic Art in Ljublijana, among others. Part of both the pre-war and postwar Avant Garde, at the beginning of the 1950s she became associated with the Spatialist current in the Italian milieu. After the 1960s, she retreated from the art world, to return in the 1980s with a sharply different style reminiscent of pop art. In 1980, she is said to have declared "What about the eighties in art? Sorry, but the eighties will be mine."

She was married to Vinicio Vianello, a painter and designer.

== Notable works ==
- Sincerely Yours, 1980
- Untitled, 1954
