= Under the Tuscan Sun (book) =

Book by Frances Mayes

Under the Tuscan Sun: At Home in Italy
- Hardcover edition
- Author: Frances Mayes
- Language: English
- Set in: Tuscany
- Published: September 1, 1996
- Publisher: Chronicle Books
- Publication place: United States
- Media type: Print, e-book, audiobook
- Pages: 299
- Awards: The New York Times Notable Book of 1997
- ISBN: 978-0-7679-0038-6
- OCLC: 1101642227

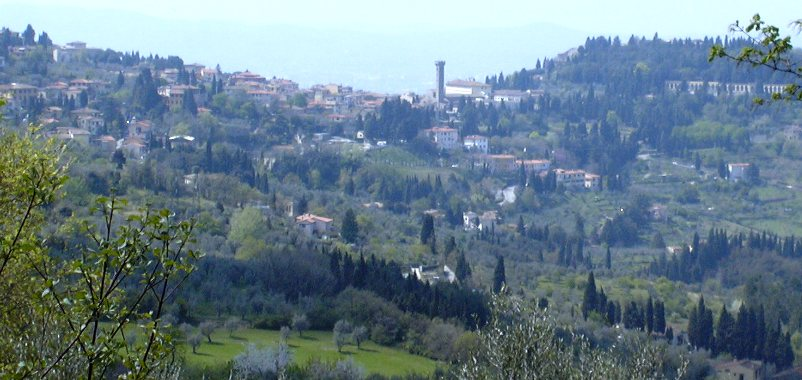
The countryside of Tuscany, Italy, where the account takes place.

Under the Tuscan Sun: At Home in Italy is a 1996 memoir by American author Frances Mayes. It was adapted by director Audrey Wells for the 2003 film Under the Tuscan Sun. The book, published by Random House, was a New York Times bestseller for more than two and a half years, and was a New York Times Notable Book of 1997. It includes several chapters of recipes, and describes how she bought and restored an abandoned villa in the Tuscan countryside. As of 2016, Under the Tuscan Sun had been translated into 54 languages.

== Plot ==
The story details the trials that recently divorced Frances and her new significant other, Ed, had to go through to renovate their Tuscan property, an abandoned villa named Bramasole ("longing for the sun") in rural Cortona in Tuscany. As university professors, they did not have to work during the summer; instead of teaching, they spent their summers renovating. While going through an extensive amount of paperwork to begin construction, they meet and befriend many people, including a group of Polish men and a local man who fixes their stone wall.

They encounter many problems along the way; their Italian is poor and their contractors are lazy.

Throughout the story, Frances imagines the villa's previous owner, possibly a kind old nonna. She pictures how the nonna would react to the renovations that Frances was doing to her home.

The couple's main interest is to be able to return to their villa during Christmas break to celebrate the holidays. Unfortunately, for their first Christmas in Tuscany, they found their villa in shambles. This setback is resolved later in the book, when Frances and Ed finally get to spend their winter break in the villa.

== Reception ==
A Publishers Weekly review stated, "The recently divorced author is euphoric about the old house in the Tuscan hills that she and her new lover renovated and now live in during summer vacations and on holidays. A poet, food-and-travel writer, Italophile and chair of the creative writing department at San Francisco State University, Mayes is a fine wordsmith and an exemplary companion whose delight in a brick floor she has just waxed is as contagious as her pleasure in the landscape, architecture and life of the village. Not the least of the charms of her book are the recipes for delicious meals she has made. Above all, her observations about being at home in two very different cultures are sharp and wise."

Alida Becker of The New York Times wrote, "Her book is a romance for people who'd rather read M. F. K. Fisher than Barbara Cartland. There are nods to Gaston Bachelard's Poetics of Space, insights into Renaissance painting and references to James Joyce and Gabriel Garcia Marquez, but what Ms. Mayes mostly provides are the kind of satisfyingly personal crotchets and enthusiasms you might exchange with an old friend over a cup of coffee at the kitchen table (though most people can't do this in a kitchen that was originally a chapel and later housed oxen and chickens). Casual and conversational, her chapters are filled with craftsmen and cooks, with exploratory jaunts into the countryside -- but what they all boil down to is an intense celebration of what she calls 'the voluptuousness of Italian life.'"

Jason Wilson of The New Yorker commented, "I recently revisited Under the Tuscan Sun this year, on the occasion of its twentieth anniversary, and discovered that my opinion of the book has grown ever so slightly more generous with age. This is not to say that I found the book free of flaws the second time around. For one, it contains virtually no narrative conflicts; each incident that could potentially cause tension gets resolved within paragraphs or, at most, a few pages."

== Film ==
In 2003, the book was adapted into major international feature film, Under the Tuscan Sun, written, produced, and directed by Audrey Wells and starring Diane Lane, Sandra Oh, Lindsay Duncan, and Raoul Bova. The film was nominated for the Art Directors Guild Excellence in Production Design Award, and Diane Lane received a Golden Globe Award nomination for her performance.
