= Pasquarosa =

Italian painter (1896–1973)

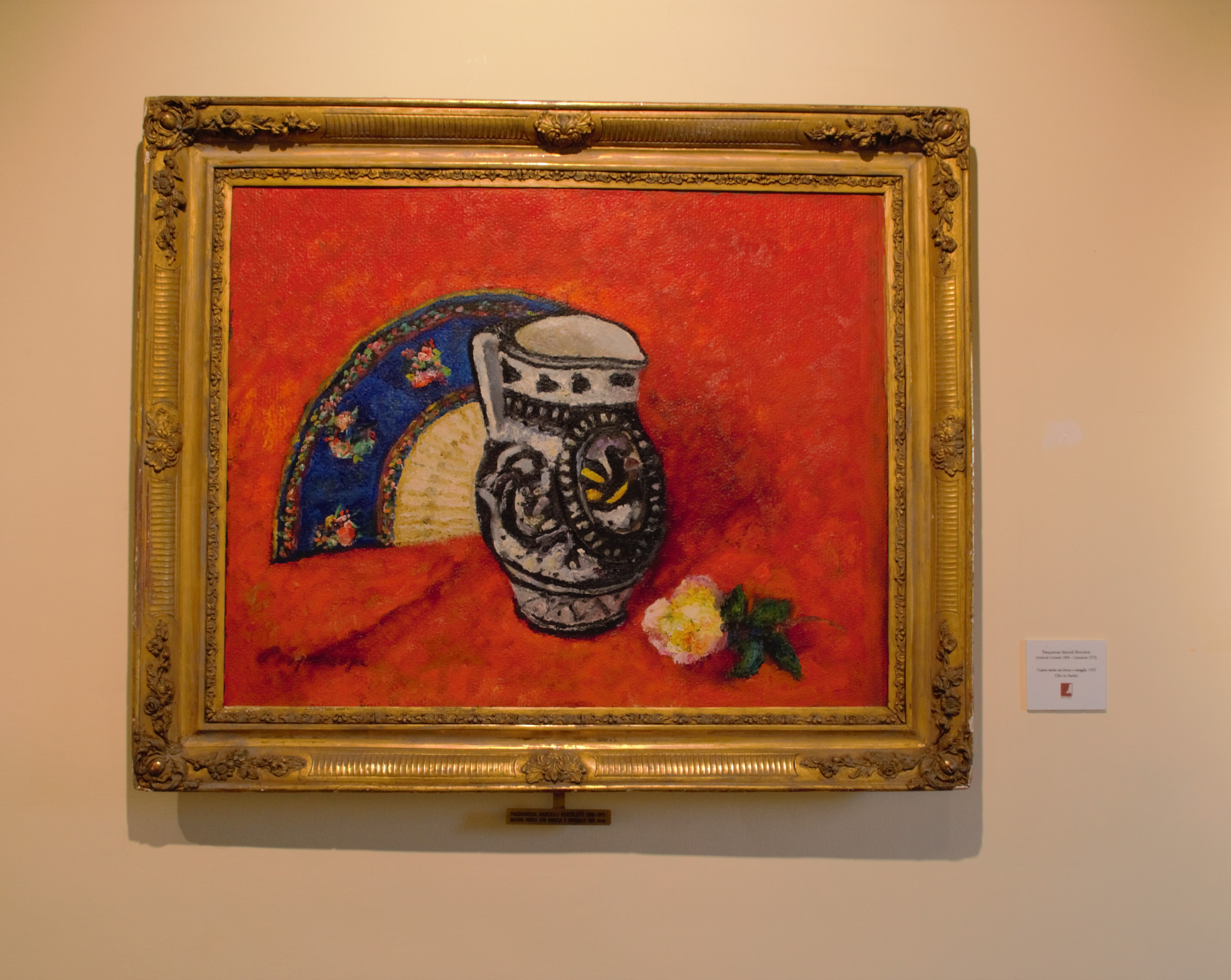
- Still life, 1933
- Born: Pasquarosa Marcelli; 9 November 1896; Anticoli Corrado
- Died: 20 October 1973 (aged 76); Camaiore
- Known for: Painting
- Movement: Italian modernism
- Spouse: Nino Bertoletti
- Children: 2
- Awards: Marzotto Prize; 1953

Pasquarosa Marcelli, known as Pasquarosa (9 November 1896 – 20 October 1973), was an Italian modernist painter. Her work consists largely of still lifes of everyday scenes, loosely rendered in a vivid palette showing the influence of Fauvism.

== Biography ==
Pasquarosa Marcelli was born on 9 November 1896 to farmers Francesco and Maria Meddi in Anticoli Corrado, a picturesque village in the Aniene valley. The place was known to artists both for its landscape qualities and for its inhabitants, who had the habit of going to Rome to model for the studios in Via Margutta or for the Academy of Fine Arts.

She started her career as a model, posing for the sculptor Nicola D'Antino and the painter Felice Carena. Between 1913 and 1916 she lived with the Roman painter Nino Bertoletti in Villa Strohl Fern in the grounds of the Villa Borghese in Rome, where many artists had their studios, including Francesco Trombadori, Carlo Socrate and Armando Spadini. There, Pasquarosa dropped her surname and learned how to paint, despite never having had any formal training. In 1915 she painted Carena, for whom she had previously modelled. She made her exhibition debut in 1915 by showing five paintings at the Third International Art Exhibition of the Roman Secession, with unexpected success. Her still lifes were purchased by Queen Margherita of Italy, the architect Pietro Aschieri, and Pierre-Albert Besnard, a painter and director of the French Academy at Villa Medici. Critics praised the spontaneous and original character of her imagery, with one describing her as a “phenomenon”.

In 1929 Pasquarosa had her first solo exhibition in London, at the Arlington Gallery, where she exhibited thirty-nine paintings. This was highly unusual for a female Italian artist at that time. In 1928, 1929 and 1932 she exhibited at the Lazio Fascist Trade Syndicate.

Between the world wars she travelled extensively, coming into contact with key figures of the artistic and cultural establishment of the day, including Luigi Pirandello, Giorgio de Chirico and Renato Guttuso.

After the Second World War she resumed exhibiting more intensely, and received critical recognition. In 1948 she participated in the National Exhibition of Figurative Arts in Rome and the 24th Venice Biennale. In the 1950s she had several personal exhibitions: in 1951 at the Vetrina di Chiurazzi gallery in Rome; in 1952 in Ancona at the Puccini gallery; in 1955 at the Russo gallery in Rome. In 1954 she exhibited again at the Venice Biennale.

In 1953 Pasquarosa won the international Marzotto Prize for painting.

She exhibited at the Art Bienniale in Rome, and at the IX Rome Quadriennale in 1965–1966.

Pasquarosa and Bertoletti married in 1927, and had two sons. She died in Camaiore, in Versilia, on 20 October 1973, two years after the death of her husband.

Many of her paintings are preserved in Rome in the National Gallery of Modern and Contemporary Art, the picture gallery of the Quirinal Palace, and the Nino and Pasquarosa Bertoletti Archive; and in private collections.

An exhibition titled "Pasquarosa: From Muse to Painter" was held at the Estorick Collection of Modern Italian Art gallery in London in 2024, featuring fifty of her paintings and drawings.

== Bibliography ==
- Pancotto, Pier Paolo (October 1997). Pasquarosa (1896-1973) una pittrice tra le secessioni e la Scuola romana (in Italian). Rome: Galleria Campo dei Fiori. ISBN 978-88-6060-222-0.
- Fusco, Lucia (May–June 2017). "Storie di donne che hanno fatto la Storia: Pasquarosa Bertoletti Marcelli". Nuova Informazione (in Italian). XXIII (5–6): 155–157.
- Girard, Laura (2022). De modèle paysanne à peintresse. Histoire(s) de l'émancipation de Deiva de Angelis et Pasquarosa à la Villa Strohl-Fern (Master's Thesis) (in French). Paris: University of Paris I Panthéon Sorbonne.
