= Andrea Cottini =

Italian footballer (born 1976)

Personal information
- Full name: Andrea Cottini
- Date of birth: 23 March 1976 (age 50)
- Place of birth: Cortona, Italy
- Height: 1.93 m (6 ft 4 in)
- Position: Defender

Senior career*
Years	Team	Apps	(Gls)
1995–98	Perugia	44	(0)
1998–99	Ancona	22	(0)
1999–01	Cesena	23	(0)
2001–04	Sambenedettese	45	(0)
2004–05	Reggiana	29	(0)
2005–06	Pro Sesto	14	(0)
2006–09	Cisco Roma	64	(1)
- * Club domestic league appearances and goals

Andrea Cottini (born 23 March 1976) is a retired Italian footballer. He played as a defender.
