= Audrey Wells =

American director, screenwriter, and producer (1960–2018)

- Born: Audrey Ann Lederer; January 25, 1960; San Francisco, California, U.S.
- Died: October 4, 2018 (aged 58); Santa Monica, California, U.S.
- Occupations: Screenwriter; film director; producer
- Years active: 1996–2018
- Spouse: Brian Larky
- Children: Tatiana Wells

Audrey Ann Wells (née Lederer; January 25, 1960 – October 4, 2018) was an American screenwriter, film director, and producer. Her 1999 film Guinevere won the Waldo Salt Screenwriting Award.

== Early life and education ==
Wells was born in San Francisco, California, to Austrian-born psychiatrist Wolfgang Lederer and Romanian-born psychologist Alexandra Botwin Lederer; her parents fled World War II-era Europe. She had Ashkenazi Jewish and Sephardi Jewish ancestry.

She graduated from U.C. Berkeley and UCLA.

== Career ==
Wells worked as a disc jockey at San Francisco jazz radio station KJAZ FM.

She wrote a number of successful screenplays and directed three for which she had created the script. Her works were primarily comedies and romance films. Among her films are The Truth About Cats & Dogs (1996) and Under the Tuscan Sun (2003), both of which she also produced. Her 1999 film Guinevere won the Waldo Salt Screenwriting Award at the Sundance Film Festival. Wells also co-wrote the script for the comedy The Game Plan.

== Death ==
Wells was diagnosed with cancer in 2013. She continued to work on film projects up until her death. Wells died on October 4, 2018, at age 58 due to cancer.

The film The Hate U Give, for which she wrote the screenplay, was released the day after she died.

She also wrote the screenplay for the 2020 Netflix/Pearl Studio animated feature Over the Moon, which was dedicated to her memory.

== Filmography ==
- The Truth About Cats & Dogs (1996), writer/executive producer
- George of the Jungle (1997), co-screenwriter
- Guinevere (1999), writer/director (feature directorial debut)
- Disney's The Kid (2000), writer
- Under the Tuscan Sun (2003), screen story writer/screenwriter/director/producer
- Shall We Dance? (2004), screenwriter
- The Game Plan (2007), co-story writer
- The Fugees (2012), director
- A Dog's Purpose (2017), co-screenwriter
- The Hate U Give (2018), screenwriter (film released posthumously)
- Abominable (2019), Additional screenplay material with Irena Brigull and William Davies (film released posthumously)
- Over the Moon (2020), writer (film released posthumously) - The film was dedicated to her memory.

== See also ==
- List of female film and television directors
