= Cortona =

- Comune
- Città di Cortona
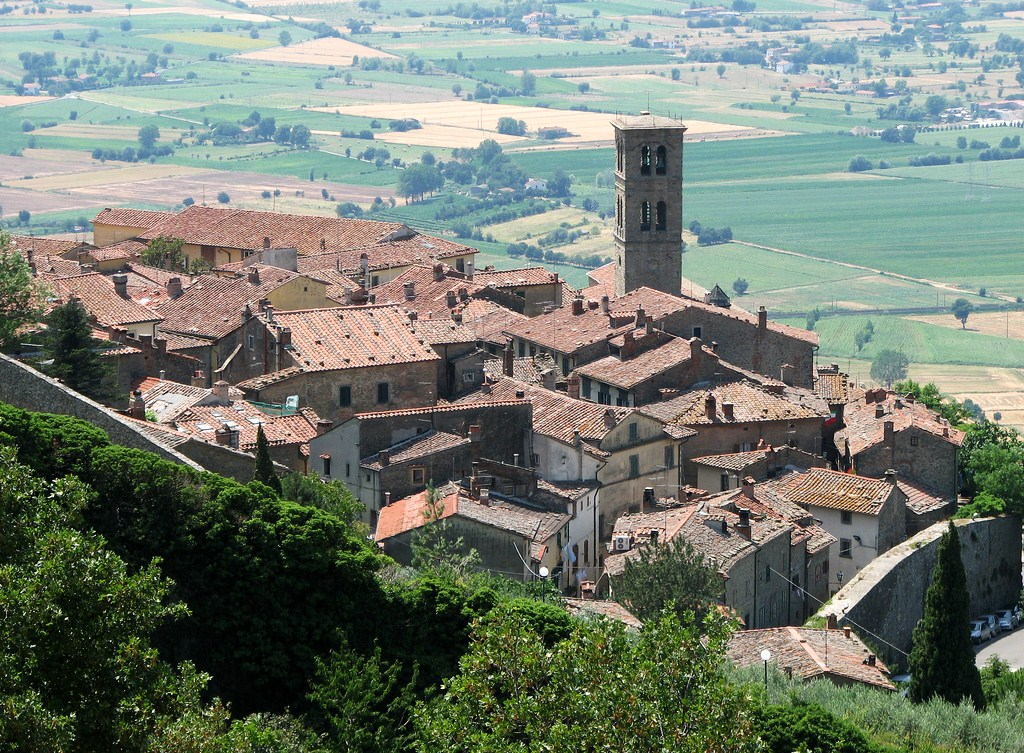
- View of Cortona

- Coat of arms

- Location within Italy Location within Tuscany
- Coordinates: 43°16′32″N 11°59′17″E
- Country: Italy
- Region: Tuscany
- Province: Arezzo (AR)

Area
  - Total: 343 km^{2} (132 sq mi)
- Elevation: 494 m (1,621 ft)

Population (30 June 2017)
  - Total: 22,104
  - Density: 64.4/km^{2} (167/sq mi)
- Demonym(s): Cortonese (singular), Cortonesi (plural)
- Time zone: UTC+1 (CET)
  - Summer (DST): UTC+2 (CEST)
- Postal code: 52044
- Patron saint: Saint Margaret of Cortona
- Saint day: 22 February
- Website: Official website

Cortona (/kɔːrˈtoʊnə/; Italian: [korˈtoːna]) is a town and comune in the province of Arezzo, in Tuscany, Italy. It is the main cultural and artistic centre of the Val di Chiana after Arezzo.

== Toponymy ==
Cortona is derived from Latin Cortōna, and from Etruscan 𐌂𐌖𐌓𐌕𐌖𐌍 (curtun). According to linguist Helmut Rix, ethnic in Etruscan was curthute (curѳute), attested as a gentile in an inscription from Chiusi, in the province of Siena.

== History ==
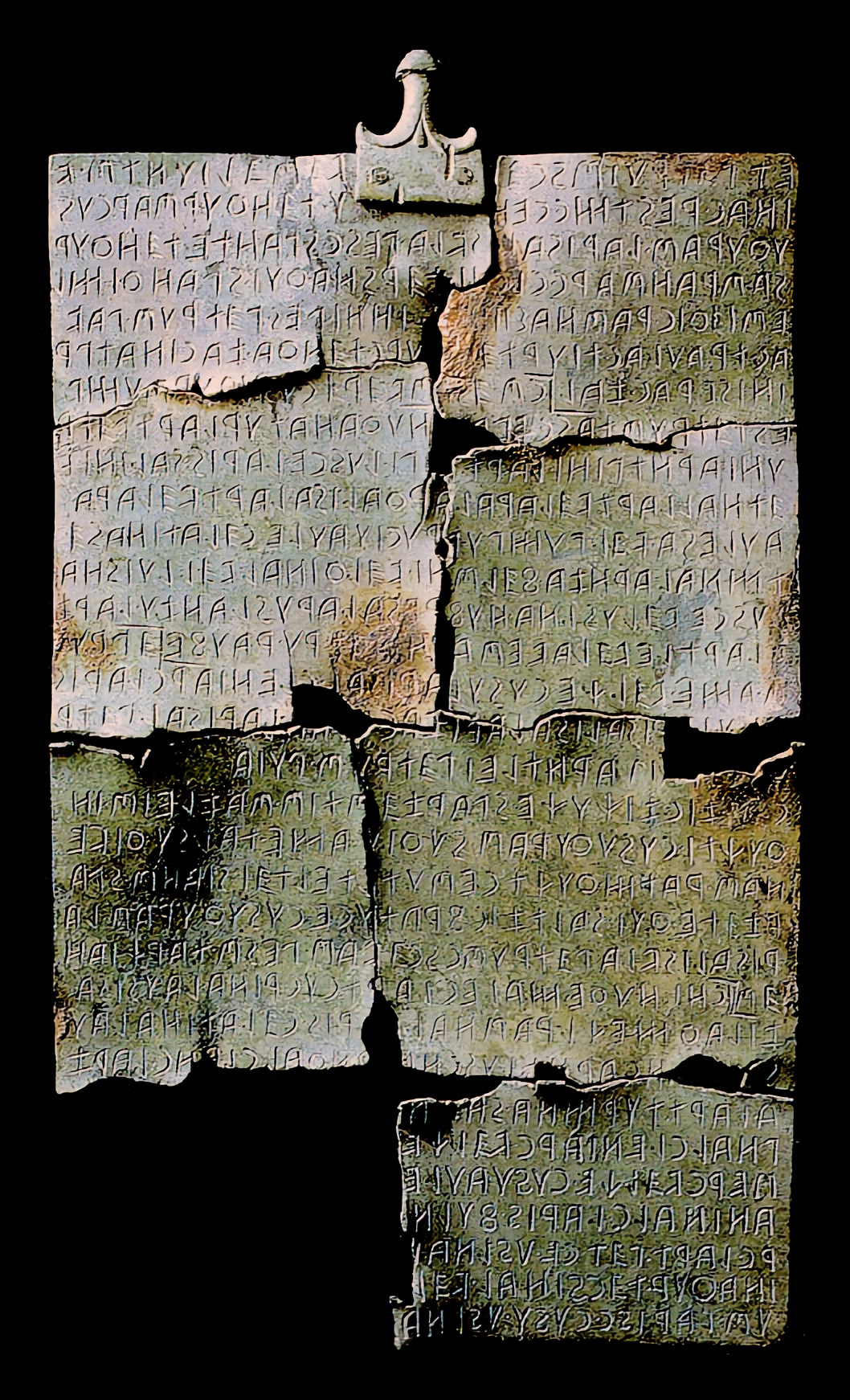
Tabula Cortonensis

=== Etruscan period ===
An Etruscan presence is found archaeologically from the late Villanovan while there is no such evidence of an Umbrian origin of the city. Between the 8th and 7th centuries BC it became an important member of the Etruscan League or a lucumonia. Most likely, Cortona became a very powerful city thanks to its strategic position, which allowed a wide control of nearby territory.

In the 4th century BC the Etruscans built the imposing walls that surround the city for about 3 km, the "melon" tombs scattered around the city and the monumental funerary altar (Tumulus II of the Sodo) adorned with sphinxes, a unique example in Italy. The Tabula Cortonensis was also found here, a bronze sheet with one of the longest inscriptions in the Etruscan language.

In 310 BC many Etruscan cities were subdued by Rome and Cortona made an alliance with Rome which however was not respected and led to a violent clash near Lake Trasimeno.

=== Roman period ===
Cortona eventually became a Roman colony under the name Corito. Cortona lost much of its influence under Roman rule. The Via Cassia, the main Roman artery through central Etruria, led directly from Chiusi to Arezzo, bypassing Cortona.

During the Second Punic War Hannibal besieged and attacked Cortona. The famous battle of Trasimeno took place not far away and the hamlet of Ossaia, not far from the battlefield, takes its name because the remains of the dead were amassed there, becoming an ossuary.

Traces from the Roman period can also be found in the names of some local hamlets, in particular Metelliano, derived from the toponym of the patrician family Metelli, and Centoia on an ancient checkpoint near the via Cassia, seat of a Century, sub-unit of the Roman army.

In 450 AD the Goths occupied Cortona. In the final stages of the Gothic War (535–554), Cortona was sacked and destroyed.

=== Later History ===
Cortona became a Ghibellinian city state in the 13th century, with its own currency. From 1325 to 1409, the Ranieri-Casali family successfully ruled the town. After being conquered by Ladislaus of Naples in 1409, Cortona was sold to the Medici in 1411. In 1737, the senior branch of the Medici line became extinct and Cortona came under the authority of the House of Lorraine. Following the Italian Wars of Independence, Tuscany—Cortona included—became part of the Kingdom of Italy.

It had a population of around 5,000 inhabitants by the 1840s.

=== Cortona foundation myth ===
The foundation of Cortona remains mixed in myths dating to classic times. These were later reworked especially in the late Renaissance period under Cosimo I de' Medici. The 17th-century Guide of Giacomo Lauro, reworked from writings of Annio da Viterbo, states that 108 years after the Great Flood, Noah entered the Valdichiana via the Tiber and Paglia rivers. He preferred this place to anywhere else in Italy, because it was so fertile, and dwelt there for thirty years. One of Noah's descendants was Crano, his son who came to the hilltop and, liking the high position, the fine countryside and the calm air, built the city of Cortona on it in 273 years after the Great Flood.

== Main sights ==
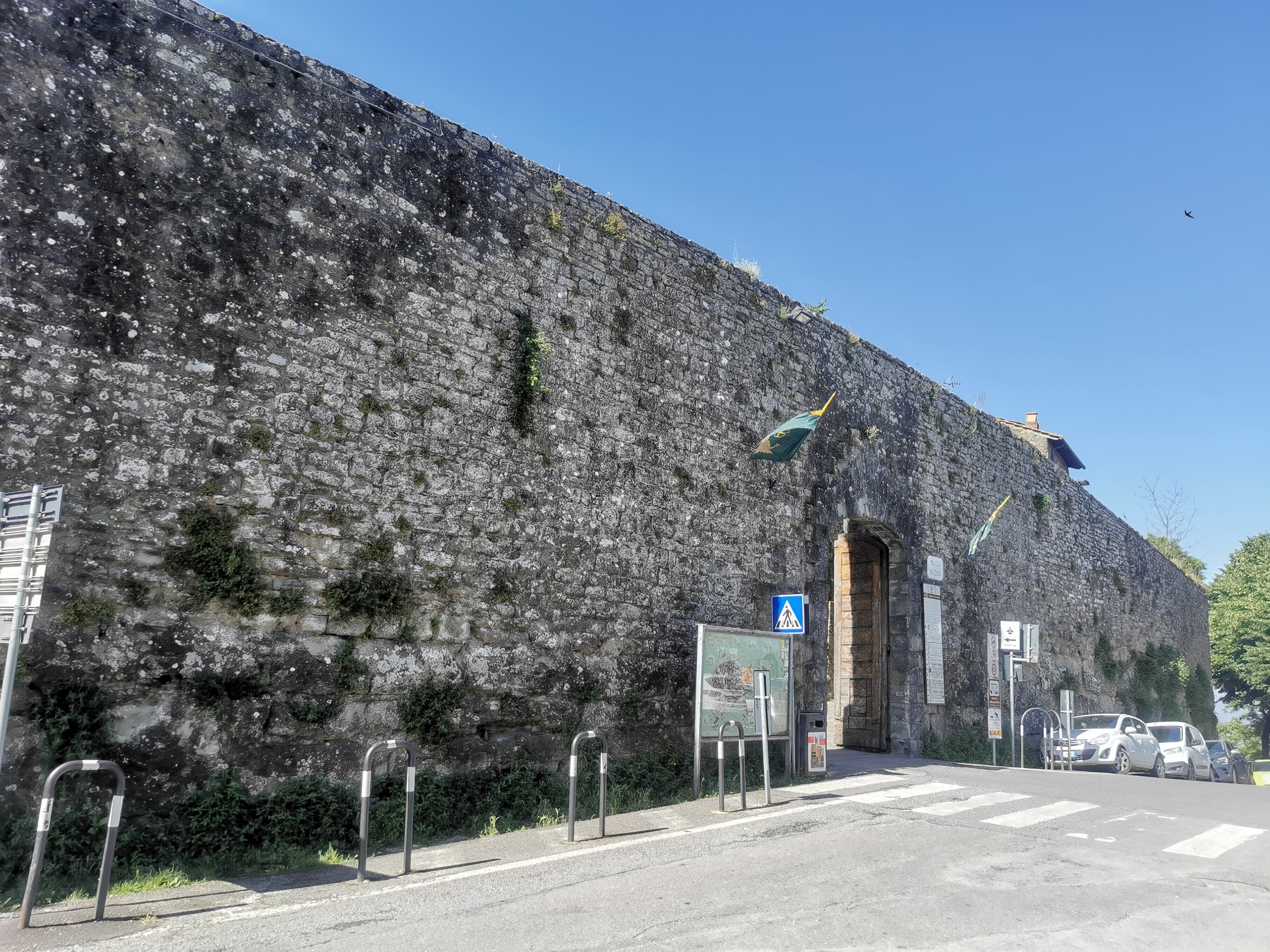
Etruscan city wall

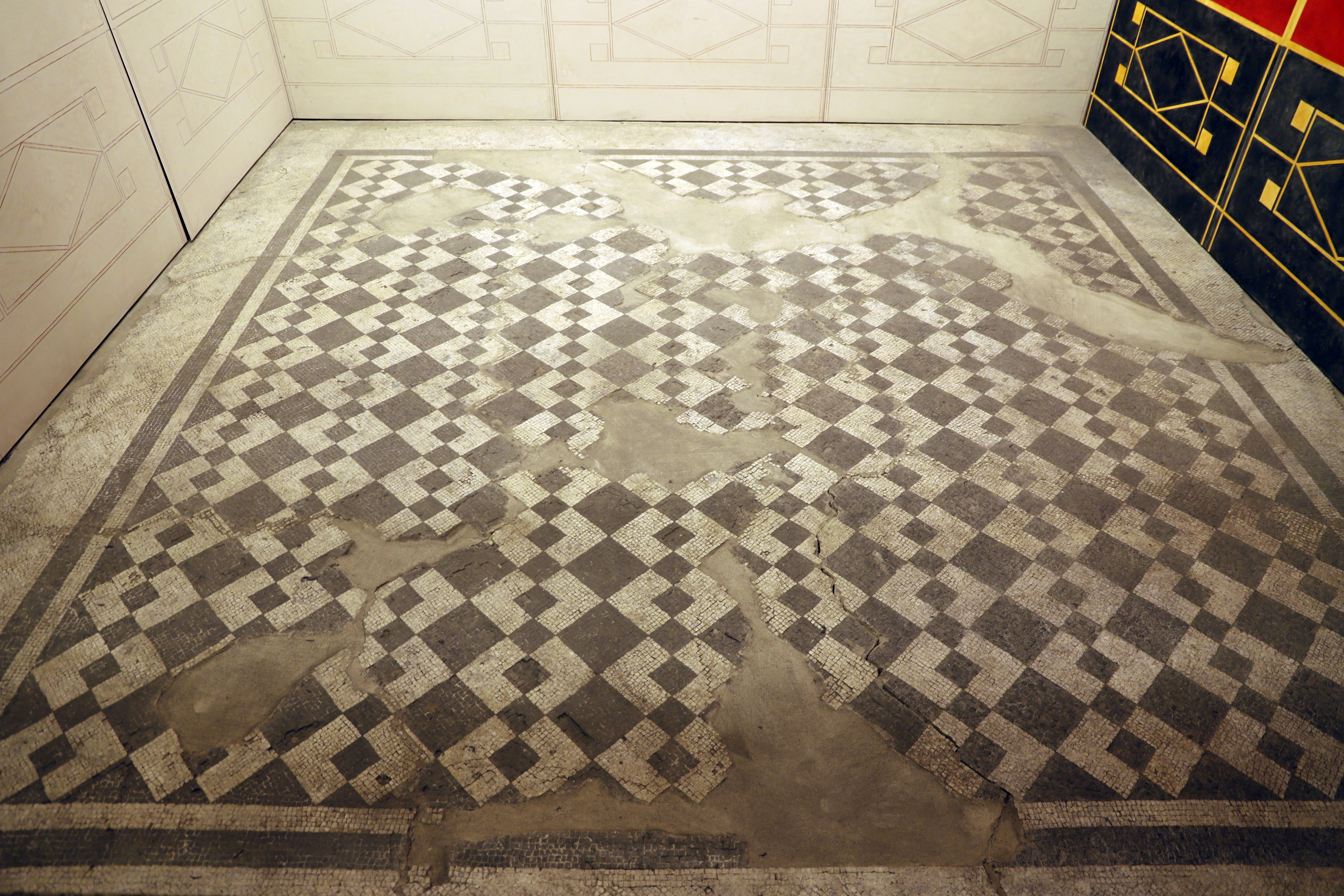
Bedroom mosaic floor, Roman Villa of Ossaia, Augustan era

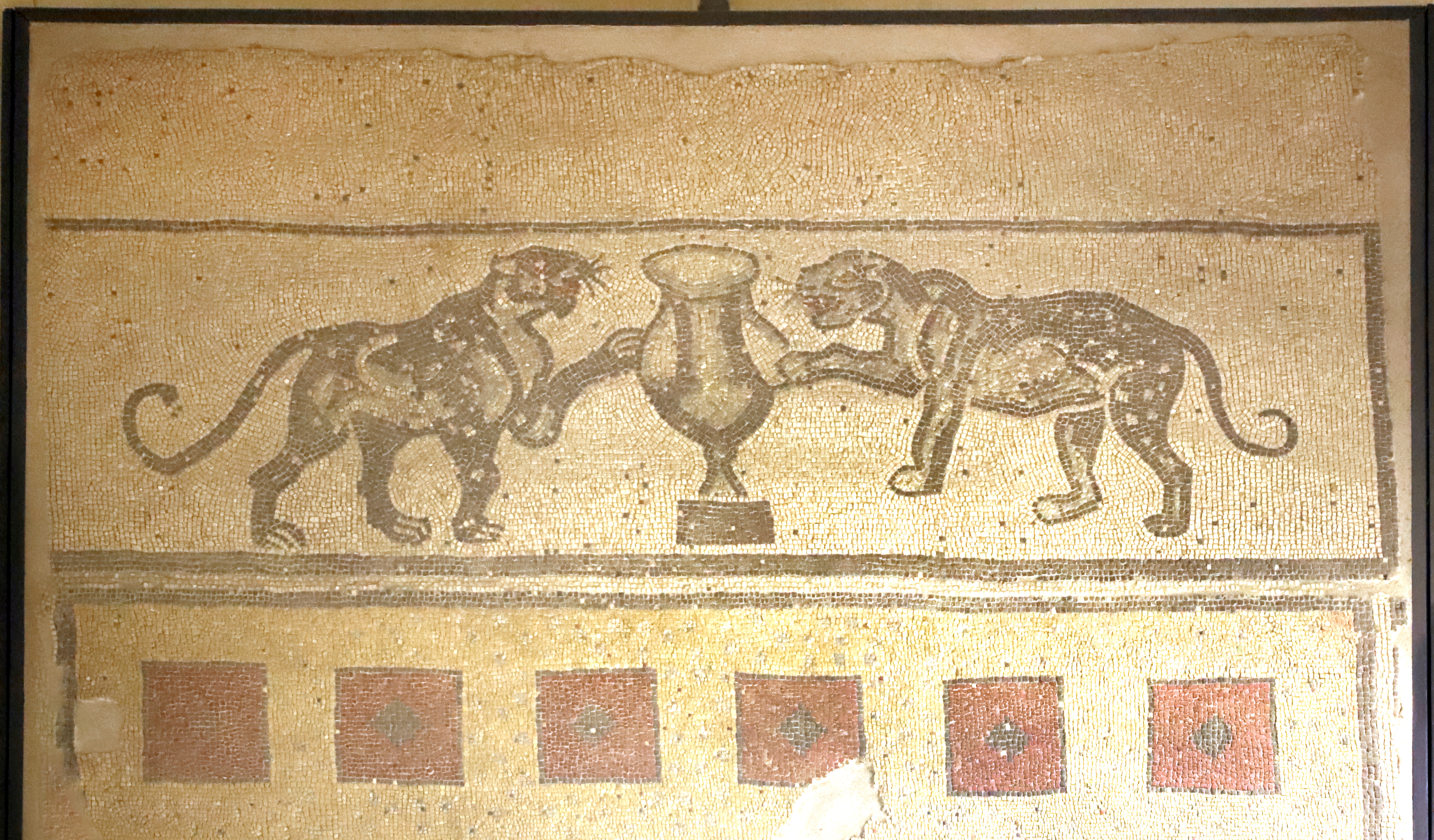
Mosaic from the apsidial room, area 3, Roman Villa of Ossaia

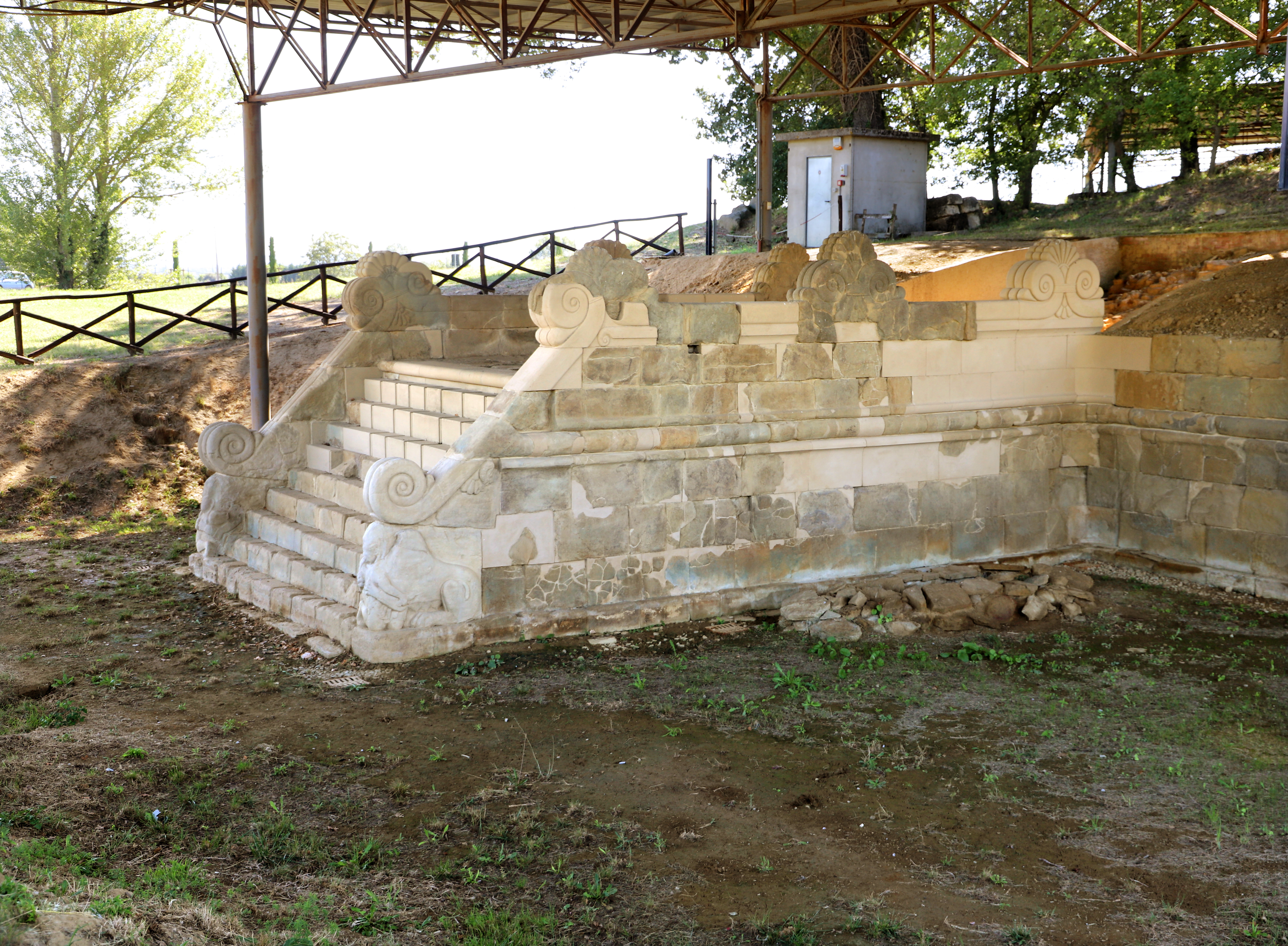
Etruscan Tumulus II of sodo

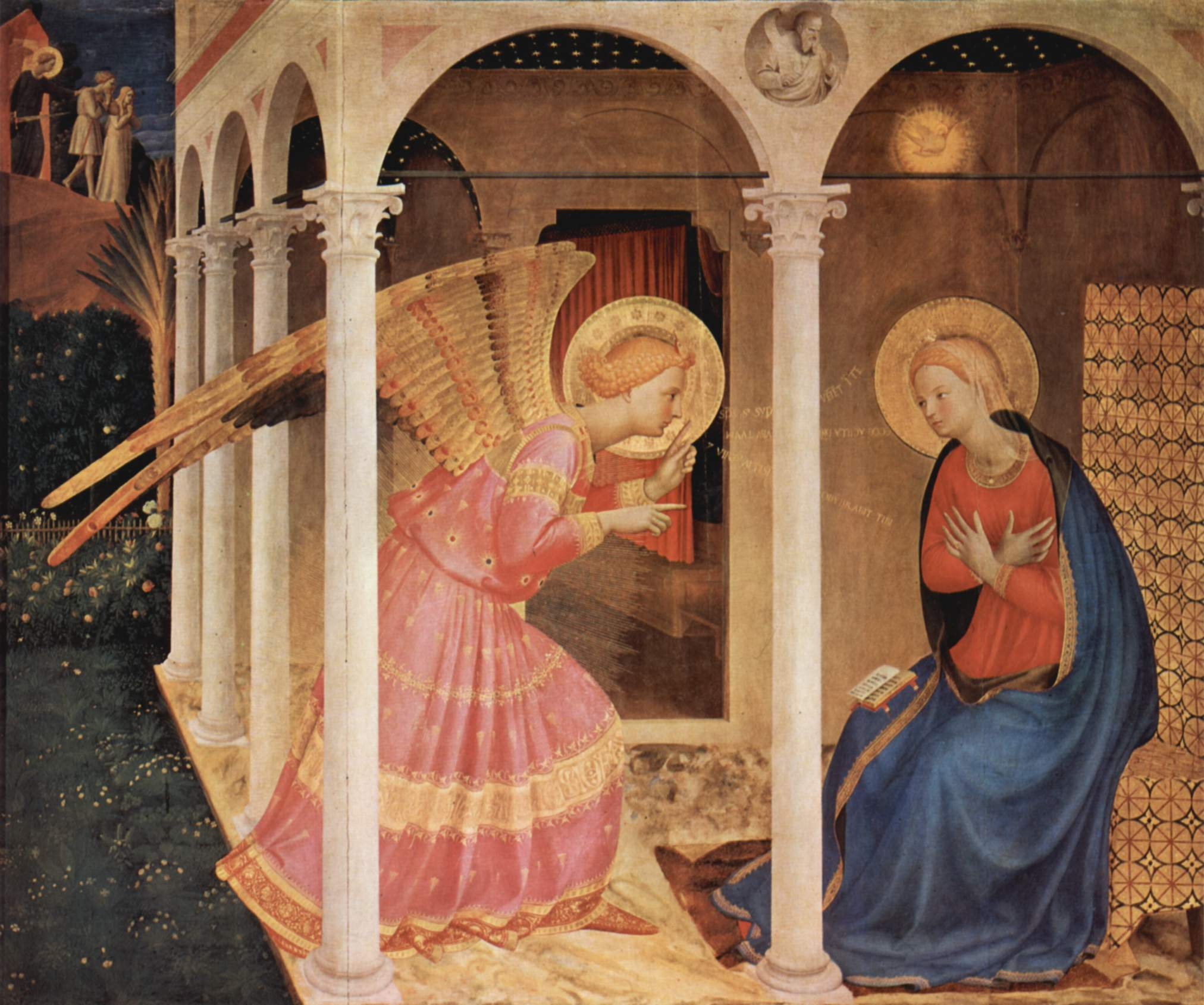
The Fra Angelico Annunciation

The prevailing character of Cortona's architecture is medieval with steep narrow streets situated on a hillside at an elevation of 600 metres (2,000 ft) that embraces a view of the whole of the Valdichiana. From the Piazza Garibaldi (still referred to by the local population by its older name, Piazza Carbonaia) is a fine prospect of Lake Trasimeno, scene of Hannibal's ambush of the Roman army in 217 BC (Battle of Lake Trasimene).

Cortona Archaeological Park hosts interesting remains from the Etruscan city state, including ancient walls, buildings and ceremonial tombs. boasts a number of interesting remains from its past as an Etruscan city state. The surrounding countryside is dotted with sections of ancient walls, buildings and ceremonial tombs. Parts of the Etruscan city wall can still be seen today as the basis of the present wall. The main street, via Nazionale, is the only street in the town with no gradient, and is still usually referred to by locals by its older name of Ruga Piana. Outside Cortona are the Roman villa at Ossaia and the Roman roads in the hills nearby which can still be traveled today.

The Palazzo Casali, also known as Palazzo Pretorio, houses the Museo dell'Accademia Etrusca, displaying items from Etruscan, Roman, and Egyptian civilizations, as well as art and artefacts from the Medieval and Renaissance eras. The distinguished Etruscan Academy Museum had its foundation in 1727 with the collections and library of Onofrio Baldelli. Among its most famous ancient artefacts is the bronze lampadario or Etruscan hanging lamp, found at Fratta near Cortona in 1840 and then acquired by the Academy for the large sum of 1600 Florentine scudi. Its iconography includes (under the 16 burners) alternating figures of Silenus playing panpipes or double flutes, and of sirens or harpies. Within zones representing waves, dolphins and fiercer sea-creatures is a gorgon-like face with protruding tongue. Between each burner is a modelled horned head of Achelous. It is supposed that the lampadario derived from some important north Etruscan religious shrine of around the second half of the 4th century BC. A later (2nd century BC) inscription shows it was rededicated for votive purposes (tinscvil) by the Musni family at that time. The Museum contains several other important Etruscan bronzes.

Etruscan chamber-tombs nearby include the Tanella di Pitagora (halfway up the hill from Camucia): the fine masonry of the tomb stands exposed, but was formerly covered by an earth mound. Two at the foot of the hillside at Il Sodo, and a complex in Camucia itself. Il Sodo I, the 'Grotta Sergardi' commonly known as 'Il Melone', contains a passage, opening into parallel passages leading to square inner chambers, within a mound about 200 m (660 ft) in circumference. Although the chambers are paved with slabs of masonry the walls are constructed of pieces of rock roughly-formed into bricks. This tomb can be visited. Il Sodo II contained a large stone-stepped altar platform with carved sphinxes devouring warriors.

The town's chief artistic treasures are two panels by Fra Angelico in the Diocesan Museum, an Annunciation and a Madonna and Child with Saints. A third surviving work by the same artist is the fresco above the entrance to the church of San Domenico, likewise painted during his stay at Cortona in 1436. The Diocesan Museum houses also a group of work by Giuseppe Maria Crespi, known as Lo Spagnuolo, called Ecstasy of Saint Margaret. The Academy Museum includes the very well known painting Maternità of 1916 by the Cortonese artist Gino Severini. There are also examples of the works of Pietro da Cortona.

The villa Bramasole, built in 1504, was used as the location for the 2003 film Under the Tuscan Sun.

=== The Imperial villa of Ossaia ===
The Imperial villa was inhabited from the 1st century BC until the 6th century AD. The large, luxurious, elongated terraced villa was owned first by the consular family Vibii Pansae, followed by Gaius Caesar and Lucius Caesar, grandsons and heirs to the throne of emperor Augustus.

=== Other archaeological areas ===
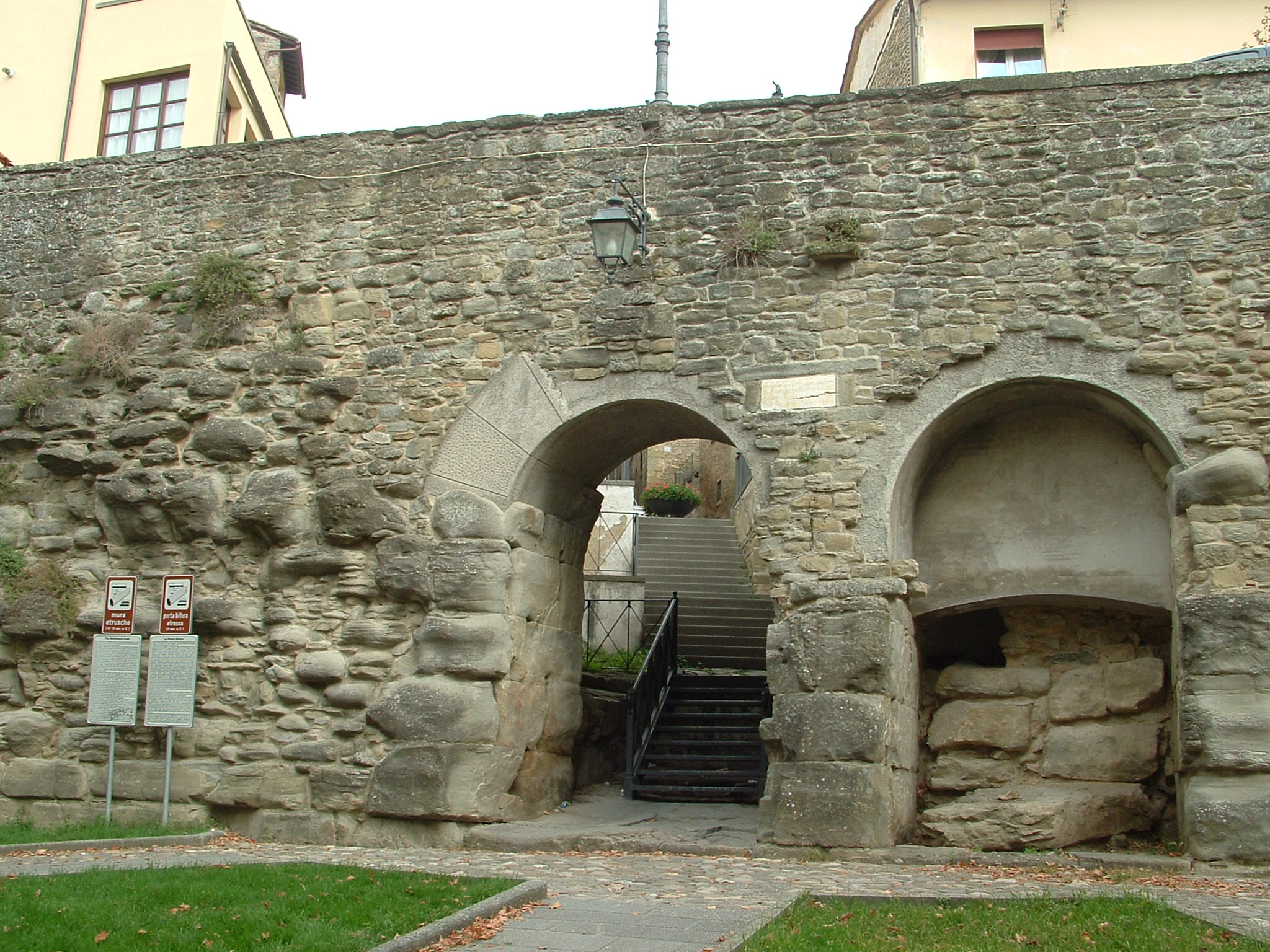
Etruscan Porta Bifora

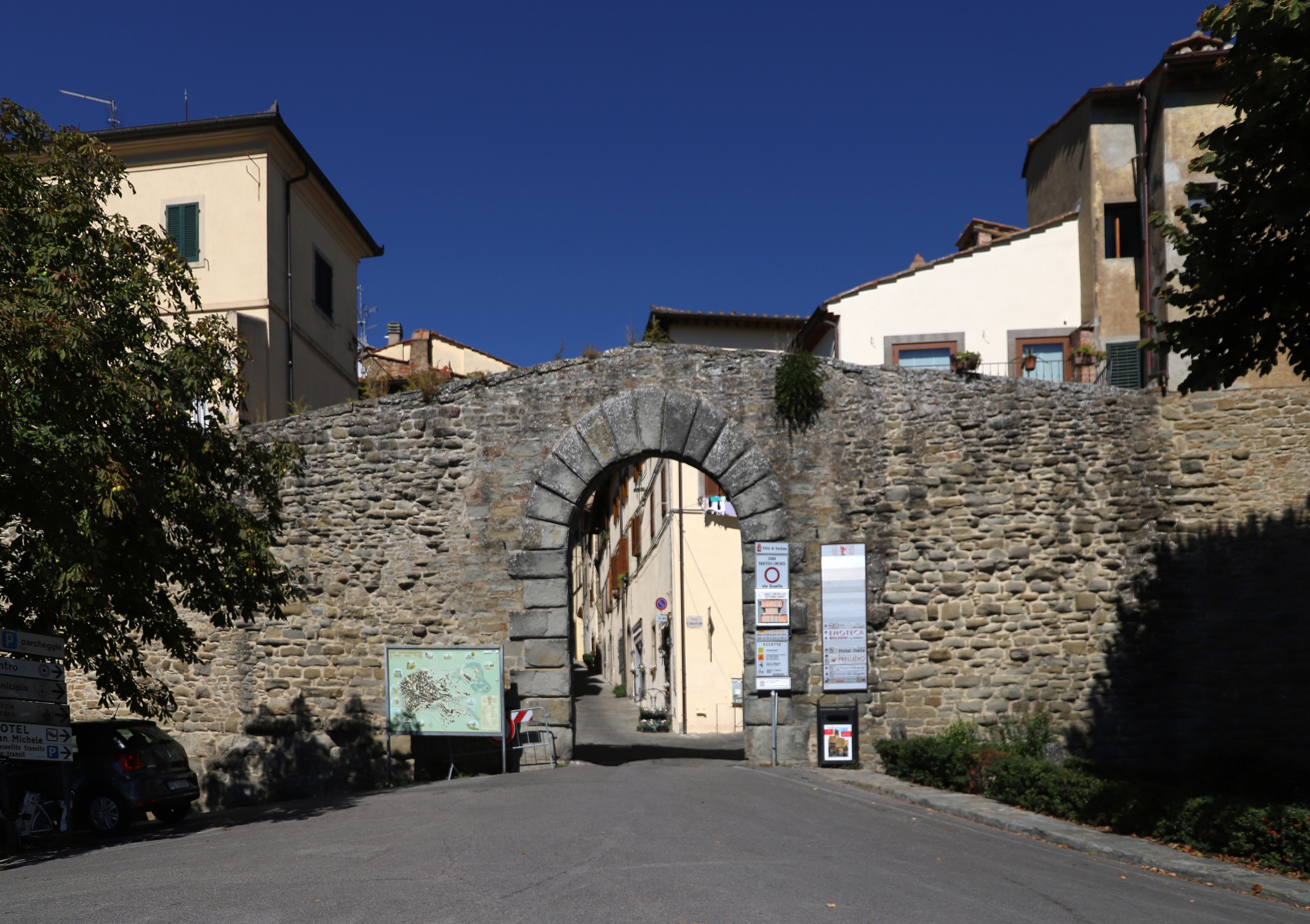
Roman Porta Sant'agostino

The archaeological park of Cortona has 11 sites, among which is the second tumulus of the Sodo, an imposing 6th century BC tomb with a monumental staircase decorated by large sculptural groups.

- Etruscan walls. The walls encircle the town on the original foundations shown by their massive stones. The Porta Bifora is double-arched and the sole remaining Etruscan Gate. The Romans repaired damaged walls and built new gates on the two main roads of the city: the Porta Sant'Agostino, Porta Colonia, Porta Santa Maria and Porta San Domenico.
- Tomb of Mezzavia
- Tumulus I of the Sodo
- Tumulus II of the Sodo
- Tanella Angori
- Tanella di Pitagora
- Tumulus of Camucia
- Roman road of Torreone
- Roman road of Mount Maestrino
- Roman road of Teverina Bassa
- Baths of Bacchus cistern
- Wall section at Palazzo Cerulli-Diligenti
- Wall section at Palazzo Casali
- Barrel vault near via Guelfa
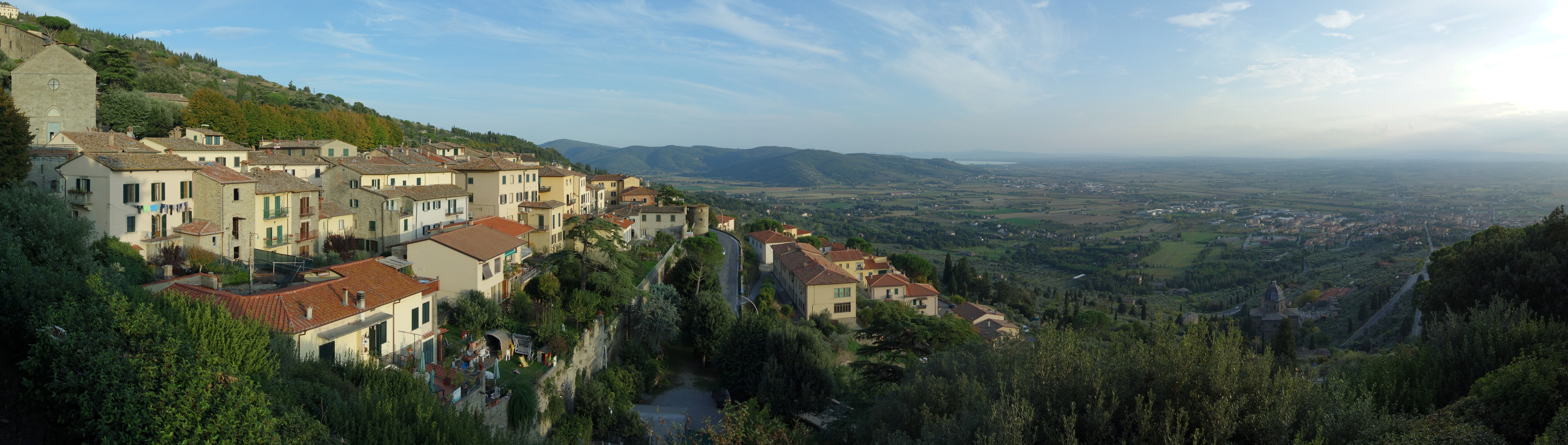
The view from Piazza Garibaldi. Lake Trasimeno can be seen in the distance.

=== Renaissance architecture ===
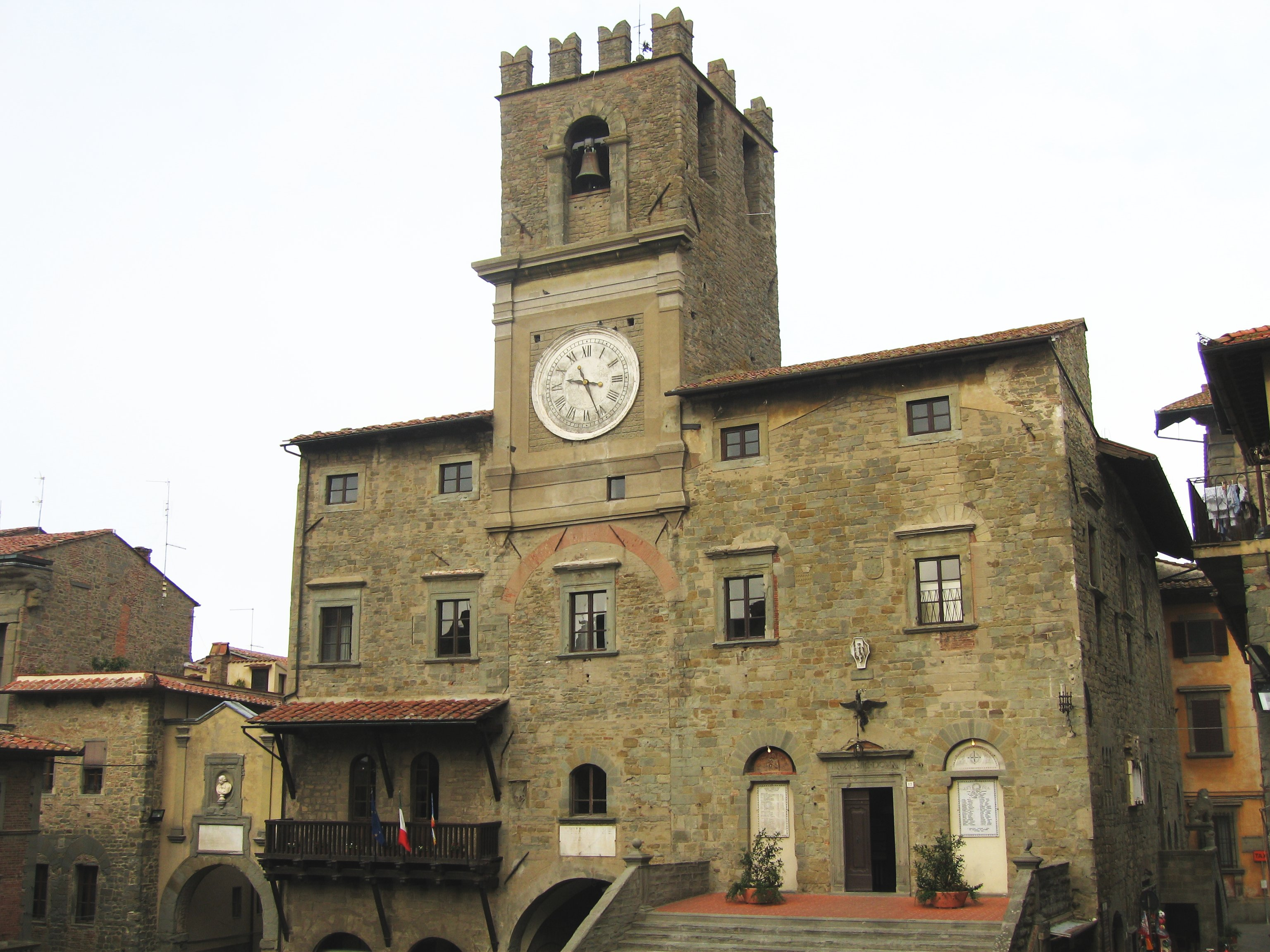
The Palazzo Comunale

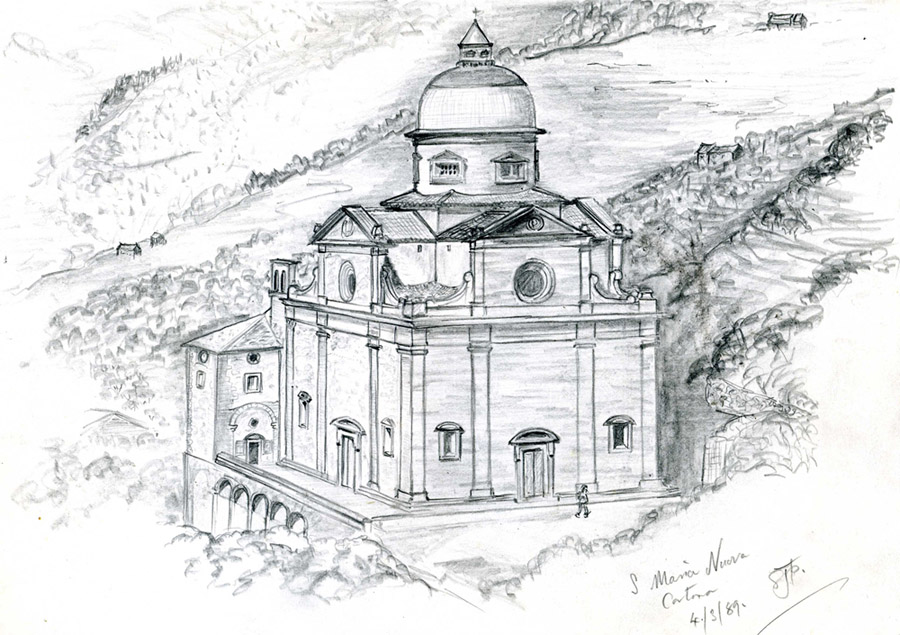
The Church of Santa Maria Nuova, 1554, a central square-plan Renaissance church

Santa Maria Nuova, built by Giorgio Vasari in 1554, is a domed church with a centralized Greek cross layout. Inside are four large columns which supports the lantern of the cupola. At the sides the four arms of the cross branch out covered with barrel-vaults, while four small cupolas arise in the spaces of the angles. The interior contains paintings depicting a Nativity by Alessandro Allori, San Carlo Borromeo administers communion to those afflicted by Plague by Baccio Ciarpi, and an Annunciation by Empoli. The church is in poor condition, and the interior is not open for visitors.

Santa Maria delle Grazie al Calcinaio was built in 1484–1515 by Francesco di Giorgio Martini to shelter a putatively miraculous icon of the Blessed Virgin Mary, the "Madonna del Calcinaio". This image was originally painted on the timbers of a lime-vat, a calcinaio, hence the name. A centralized Renaissance design was applied to the design of the nave: the eastern part of the building was generally developed into a centralized form, which would then be crowned with a large cupola, foreshadowing the cathedral at Florence. The restored interior has unusually high arches.

=== Other churches ===
- Cathedral (Duomo) of Cortona (Santa Maria)
- Basilica of Santa Margherita
- Guzzetti Chapel
- Spirito Santo
- San Benedetto
- San Cristoforo
- San Domenico
- San Filippo Neri
- San Francesco
- San Marco
- San Niccolò
- Santa Chiara
- (Former) church of the Gesù
- Abbey of Farneta
- Franciscan Convent de Le Celle
- San Donnino (or, Madonna della Croce)
- Pieve di San Michele Arcangelo at Metelliano
- Sanctuary of the Madonna del Bagno
- San Biagio at Pierle
- San Marco Evangelista

== Transportation ==
Cortona may be accessed by rail: the closest station is Camucia-Cortona, 3 kilometres (1.9 miles) away. In addition Terontola-Cortona station lies in the district of Terontola. Both stations lie on the Florence–Rome railway, while Terontola-Cortona station is also at the junction with the line to Foligno, via Perugia. There are direct trains from Florence, Rome, and Foligno (via Perugia).

== Wine ==
In 2000, Cortona established Cortona DOC (Denominazione di Origine Controllata), which has 29 members that produce and control 14 different types of wines.

== Notable people ==
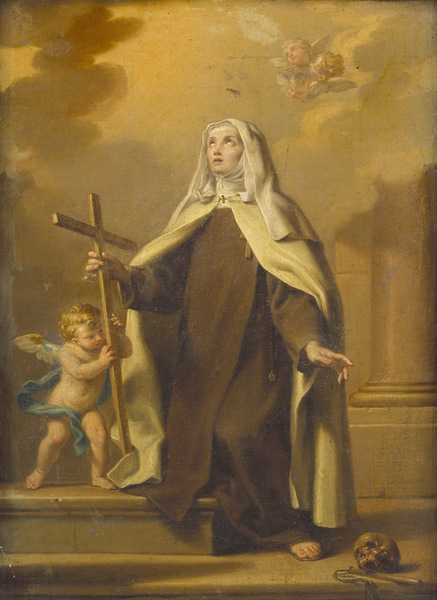
Saint Margaret of Cortona

- Margaret of Cortona (1247–1297)
- Luca Signorelli (1445–1523)
- Francesco Laparelli (1521–1570), engineer and builder
- Bernardino Radi (1581–1643), sculptor and architect
- Pietro da Cortona (1596–1669), important architect and painter
- Domenico Cecchi "il Cortona" (c. 1650/55–1717), celebrated Italian castrato and opera singer (soprano)
- Antonio Baldi (fl. 1714 – c. 1735), Italian alto castrato and opera singer
- Gino Severini (1883–1966), painter of Futurism
- Lorenzo Cherubini – Jovanotti (born 1966), musician
- Frances Mayes (born 1940), author
- Francesco Attesti (born 1975), classical pianist
- Andrea Cottini (born 1976), football player
- Zerocalcare (born 1983), cartoonist

== Sister cities ==
Cortona is twinned with:

- Athens, Georgia, United States, since 1978
- Château-Chinon, France, since 1980
- San José de los Remates, Nicaragua, since 1989
- Krujë, Albania, since 1995
- Czechowice-Dziedzice, Poland, since 2014
- Carmel, Indiana, United States, since 2022
- La Valletta, Malta, since 2022

== In popular culture ==
Cortona was featured as one of the destinations in a travel episode of Conan, in which Conan O'Brien and Jordan Schlansky (one of the show's associate producers) visit Italy. Schlansky, being a recurring visitor of Cortona, is awarded a parking space by the city's mayor and introduces O' Brien to his favourite restaurant, where he, with questionable success, explains the food, wine, and the surrounding area, to his travel companion.

Cortona was also featured in Frances Mayes' book Under the Tuscan Sun, basis for the eponymous movie starring Diane Lane. She visits Cortona on a tour and buys a villa on the outskirts.

Cortona was also featured in Buffy the Vampire Slayer season 1, episode 8: "I, Robot... You, Jane", where a circle of priests trap the demon Moloch into a book using a magic ritual.

== See also ==
- Tabula Cortonensis – An ancient Etruscan artifact found in the city of Cortona in 1992.
- Saint Margaret of Cortona
- Tuscan Sun Festival
