= Casale =

Casale may refer to:

- Casalis, medieval Latin for a group of houses in the countryside

== Places in Italy ==
=== Communes ===
- Casal di Principe in the province of Caserta, Campania
- Casal Velino in the province of Salerno, Campania
- Casalattico, when part of the Duchy of Sora, was known as Casale
- Casale Borgone, former name of Casalborgone in the province of Turin, Piedmont
- Casale Corte Cerro in the province of Verbano-Cusio-Ossola, Piedmont
- Casale Cremasco-Vidolasco in the province of Cremona, Lombardy
- Casale di Scodosia in the province of Padua, Veneto
- Casale Grande, former name of Casalgrande, near Modena in the province of Reggio Emilia, Emilia-Romagna
- Casale Litta in the province of Varese, Lombardy
- Casale Maggiore, former name of Casalmaggiore in the province of Cremona, Lombardy
- Casale Marittimo in the province of Pisa, Tuscany
- Casale Monferrato in the province of Alessandria, Piedmont
  - Casale F.B.C., an association football club
- Casale sul Sile in the province of Treviso, Veneto
- Conca Casale, in the province of Isernia, Molise
- Roccacasale in the Province of L'Aquila, Abruzzo
- San Pietro in Casale in the province of Bologna, Emilia-Romagna

=== Other localities ===
- Casalsottano, a frazione of San Mauro Cilento, in the province of Salerno, Campania
- Casale (Pignone), a frazione of Pignone in the province of La Spezia, Liguria
- Casale Buttano, former name of Casalbuttano, the principal centre of Casalbuttano ed Uniti in the province of Cremona, Lombardy

== Other uses ==
- Casale (surname)
- Cerro Casale, a gold mine in Chile
- Villa Romana del Casale in the town of Piazza Armerina in the province of Enna

== See also ==
- Casali, a surname
