= Bubba Trattori =

Bubba Trattori is an Italian manufacturer of tractors and other agricultural equipment.

== History ==
=== The beginning ===
The sole-trader company Pietro Bubba, former Domenico, began threshing for third parties towards the end of the nineteenth century in Santimento, a small village about twenty kilometres from Piacenza, towards Voghera. This was followed by repairing and building small equipment until, in 1896, he built the first Bubba agricultural machine: a shelling machine for small seeds. With the help of his three sons, Federico, Salvatore and Artemio, he started building the first threshers in 1896.

Over the years the company developed their threshers and presses so that by the twenties, it competed with the other manufacturers of the time such as Breda, Orsi and Casali. The first official company structure came in 1919: "Pietro Bubba & Co. limited partnership". The construction of tractors began gradually by recuperating the vehicles used during the state ploughing drives from 1917 to 1919, which were sold to private concerns at concessional prices. These vehicles, that hadn't been treated with much care by military men which "were not suitable for fighting", revealed a weakness in their Otto engines. They were not very reliable due to their imprecise management.

=== Hothead engines ===
Bubba seized this opportunity to offer farmers simple engines, which were easy to use and manage. In 1923 Ulisse Bubba, son of Federico, constructed the first hothead tractors with Bubba engines mounted on Case wagons: the UTC3, UTC4 and UTC5 tractors (U=Ulisse; T=Tractor; C=Case). The pairing was very successful, so much so that, once the sources of economical American wagons dried up, Bubba was ready to build its own wagon. In 1926 the UTB 3 (U=Ulisse; T=Tractor; B=Bubba) with 25/30 HP, saw the light of day. It was the first 100% Bubba tractor.

In 1929 the company built the prototypes of the UT2 and UT3, the latter an improved and lighter version of the UTB3, boosted to 25 HP and the UT5, the most powerful hothead tractor ever built, with its 50 HP. The engine of the UT5 was constructed by coupling two horizontal cylinder of the UT3.

=== The crisis and the new company ===
Pietro Bubba died in 1927, at 78 years of age. The Great Depression of 1929 put the company in financial difficulty and on 5 April 1930, a company that originated from SAFI in Piacenza, set up with the name Bubba S.A., took over SaS Pietro Bubba & C. Mr Luigi Lodigiani became part of the company. From the original company only Federico as designer of the threshers, Ulisse as technical manager of the plant and Artemio, who left after one year, in 1933, to set up a company to build threshers with his brother Salvatore, were left.

The first tractor built by the new company was the UT2, a 25 HP machine which was nimble and modern for the period. Designed by Ulisse, it had been ready for quite a few months, but had been blocked at the construction stage due to a lack of funds. Between 1934 and 1935 the company introduced two new models: the UT4 and UT6, with their respective road spin-offs (US) and fixed versions (UF).

The UT4 model, with its 15.38 litre engine (260 x 290 mm stroke) was probably the largest single cylinder hothead tractor ever built. The UT6, built as a smaller version of the UT4, became the basis, in 1936, for the C35 a crawler tractor. This was to be the last machine designed by Ulisse who, that year, left the company with his father Federico.

=== The Arbos-Bubba period ===
Two years later, in 1938, Bubba S.A. produced the Ariete (37/45 HP), the first Bubba tractor not designed by Ulisse, but by the engineers Emmanueli and Giorgi.

In 1943 Mr. Lodigiani was the sole owner of Bubba S.A. when the D42, with 42HP, an updated version of the Ariete, was released. Unfortunately due to the war it was not very successful. Then came the Centauro a 45/55 HP crawler tractor. During the same period Bubba S.A. tested their first self-propelled threshers with full track. In 1948 Bubba produced the first Italian self-propelled combine harvester, the 1500, preceded only by Massey Harris in 1941.

In 1950 Bubba produced the 45 HP wheeled LO5, its last ever hothead tractor. It also designed the LO6, a track version, which was never produced.

In 1952 Lodigiani moved the production plant to Santimento, close to Piacenza, San Lazzaro. Here it started producing combine harvesters with the prototype of the MT52, powered by a Deutz air-cooled engine. This was followed by the MT 100 A and the 100 B, the latter being the rice version.

In 1954 it launched a wheeled tractor with a 35 HP Perkins P4TA diesel engine, followed by a tracked version, with a choice of two engines the next year: Perkins P4TA or the 32 HP Deutz F2L514. The tractors were not very successful: by the end of December 1955 it had sold only 33 wheeled versions and 9 tracked. The Bubba name, that in 1954 had been renamed Arbos-Bubba, disappeared completely, becoming simply Arbos. The name came from a bicycle factory that had belonged to two businessmen from Piacenza (Armani and Boselli), which was by then owned by Lodigiani.

=== 2015: the rebirth ===
Foton Lovol Heavy Industry Ltd, or simply Lovol, the Chinese manufacturer of agricultural tractors and combine harvesters, announced the project to restore and promote two Italian brands that have written the history of mechanised agriculture: Bubba and Arbos.

== Main models ==
- UTC3 - UTC3: 1924, primi trattori con motore "testa calda" in Italia
- UTB3: 1926
- UT5: trattore con motore "testa calda" più grande mai realizzato
- UT4: più grande trattore monocilindrico mai costruito con motore "testa calda"
- C 35: 1936, trattore a cingoli

== See also ==
- Arbos
