= Casali family =

- Arms of the Casali of Monticelli d'Ongina
- Blazon: Per fess: first, Gules a lion Or holding in its dexter forepaw a fleur-de-lis Azure; second, Azure three mullets of eight points Or, two and one
- Branches: Casali of Cortona; Casali of Bologna; Casali of Monticelli d'Ongina; Casali of Florence, later known as Casali della Vipera; French branch of Monticelli; Casali of Rome, who became the Casali del Drago
- Period: 13th–21st centuries
- Origin: Cortona, Tuscany
- Locations: Italy: Cortona, Bologna, Rome, Florence, Lucca, Piacenza and Monticelli d'Ongina; France
- Residences: Palazzo Casali in Cortona; Palazzo Casali in Bologna; Palazzo Casali Pelagallo in Rome; Villa Casali on the Caelian Hill in Rome; Rocca di Pierle; Monticelli d'Ongina Castle
- Titles: Prince of Mazzano; Prince of Antuni; Marquess of Pastina; Marquess of Monticelli d'Ongina; Marquess of Riofreddo; Count Palatine of the Lateran; Count of Montegiorgio; Count of Castelvetro Piacentino; Count of the Ripe del Canale di Reno; Lord of Cortona; Lord of Pierle
- Dignities and offices: Cardinals; Titular Latin Patriarch of Constantinople; Governor of Rome; Camerlengo of the College of Cardinals; Bishops; Senators of Bologna; Ambassadors, including in the service of the English Crown; Rector of the University of Bologna
- Honours: (Italy) Gold Medal of Military Valor; Order of St John of Jerusalem (Portugal) Order of Christ (Spain) Order of Calatrava; Order of St Lazarus of Jerusalem

The Casali family is an Italian noble family originating in the mountains around Cortona, in Tuscany, where it is attested from the early 13th century. After holding municipal offices in Cortona, Arezzo and Pisa, the family established a lordship over Cortona and Pierle from 1325 to 1409. Following the fall of this lordship, part of the family passed through the Imola area before settling permanently in Bologna in 1434.

Admitted to Bologna's senatorial patriciate, the family produced senators, prelates and several diplomats in the service of the papacy, England, Venice and the Dukes of Parma. Branches descended from the Casali of Monticelli settled notably in Florence, Lucca and France; the main Monticelli branch and its branches established in France survive to the present day.

An old Roman branch, likewise descended from the Cortona branch, was closely connected with the Roman Curia and papal circles. A family of prelates, scholars and major collectors, it included the antiquarian Giovanni Battista Casali and Cardinal Antonio Casali. In 1814, it united with the Del Drago family to form the Casali del Drago.

== History ==
=== From the origins to the lordship of Cortona ===
Palazzo Casali in Cortona.

Attested as early as 1217, the Casali belonged to a feudal family from the mountains around Cortona. Their possessions, including Casale, Castel Giudeo and Castel Gherardo, controlled the routes between the upper Tiber valley and the Valdichiana.

In 1325, Ranieri II Casali became lord of Cortona and Pierle. His descendants retained the lordship for more than eighty years.

Imperial office also marked the family's rise: Guglielmino Casali, podestà of Arezzo in 1307, later served as imperial vicar in Cortona and as grand gonfalonier general in 1314 and 1316; Bartolomeo, who succeeded his father Ranieri in 1351, was confirmed as imperial vicar by Emperor Charles IV in 1355.

Francesco Senese had governed Cortona since 1400 when his nephew Aloigi Battista Casali had him assassinated in 1407 and seized power. This coup precipitated the lordship's final crisis: overthrown in 1409, Aloigi Battista had to surrender Cortona to King Ladislaus of Naples, who subsequently ceded the town to Florence. Casali rule over Cortona thus came to an end, and part of the family left the region.

=== Bologna, the Curia and European diplomacy ===
After initially taking refuge in the Imola area, the family settled permanently in Bologna in 1434 around Andrea Casali (died 1465), a grandson of Francesco Senese. A merchant and financier, Andrea obtained Bolognese citizenship in 1454 with the support of Cardinal Bessarion. By the following generation, the family had entered papal circles: his son Castellano, a doctor of canon law, was a protonotary under Innocent VIII and then apostolic secretary to Alexander VI; Castellano's brother Francesco was a banker and papal treasurer during the latter's pontificate. In 1495, Castellano and Francesco obtained a family chapel in the Basilica of San Domenico in Bologna, where the Mystic Marriage of Saint Catherine, painted in 1501 by Filippino Lippi for the Casali altar, is still preserved.

The Mystic Marriage of Saint Catherine by Filippino Lippi, painted for the Casali altar in the Basilica of San Domenico in Bologna.

=== The Casali in the service of Henry VIII ===
Andrea's grandson Gregorio Casali (1496–1536), Count of Castelvetro Piacentino, entered the service of Henry VIII and Cardinal Thomas Wolsey as an agent in Italy as early as 1519. The king knighted him and granted him an annual pension of two hundred gold crowns.

Appointed resident ambassador to the Holy See in 1525, Gregorio took part in negotiations over the League of Cognac and in England's relations with the papacy, Venice and France. He subsequently played a central role in the attempt to obtain the annulment of Henry VIII's marriage to Catherine of Aragon, seeking opinions from Italian jurists and theologians favourable to the royal position. He negotiated with Clement VII and Paul III and maintained relations with Francis I and Charles V. After Clement VII's death, he recommended that Cardinal Jean du Bellay support the candidacy of Alessandro Farnese, the future Paul III, at the conclave.

Gregorio's brothers participated in the same diplomatic network. His brother Giambattista Casali was sent by Clement VII to Henry VIII in 1525, then appointed the King of England's ambassador to Venice. Bishop of Belluno from 1527, he never took possession of his see because of Venetian opposition. After the sack of Rome, Giambattista urged Venice to intervene against the imperial forces and secured Alfonso d'Este's adherence to the League of Cognac; Henry VIII then tried unsuccessfully to have him made a cardinal. He remained ambassador in Venice until 1535, when he was sent to John Zápolya in Transylvania.

His brother Paolo Casali also pursued a papal and diplomatic career: a papal chamberlain, he served as nuncio in England in 1529.

His brother Francesco Casali began his military career at a very young age. Admitted to an order of knighthood by Leo X at the age of seventeen, he commanded the light troops paid by Henry VIII during the 1524 campaign in Provence and covered the imperial retreat after the siege of Marseille. He later became a captain in Venetian service, served English interests militarily and represented the King of Hungary at the Holy See.

=== Senatorial branches in Bologna ===
A first branch entered the Senate of Bologna in 1525 with Count Andrea Casali (died 1550), son of the banker Francesco. Andrea defended Bologna against Annibale Bentivoglio, held military command in the Bolognese Apennines and then took part in the siege of Florence in 1530, while facilitating the university consultations sought by Henry VIII on the annulment of his marriage. This branch included his son Alessandro Casali (1533–1582), papal ambassador to Philip II of Spain and later Bishop of Vigevano. His missions to Spain in 1566 and 1572 contributed to the transfer of Bartolomé Carranza's trial to Rome and to the recognition of Cosimo I's grand-ducal title; Philip II intervened twice, unsuccessfully, to have him made a cardinal.

Andrea's son Francesco Maria Casali succeeded him in the Senate in 1551. He commanded the guards of Bologna's legation palace and represented the city as ambassador to the Holy See.

Count Andrea's descendants continued to sit in the Senate of Bologna until his grandson Andrea Casali, born in 1584, was declared dead at the siege of Ostend in 1604, without descendants. His property passed to his cousin Count Michele Casali, who held a share in the lordship of Monticelli. In 1604, Michele's son Ferrante obtained the seat in the Senate of Bologna. The Monticelli branch thus combined its seigneurial position in the Piacenza area with the family's Bolognese political inheritance.

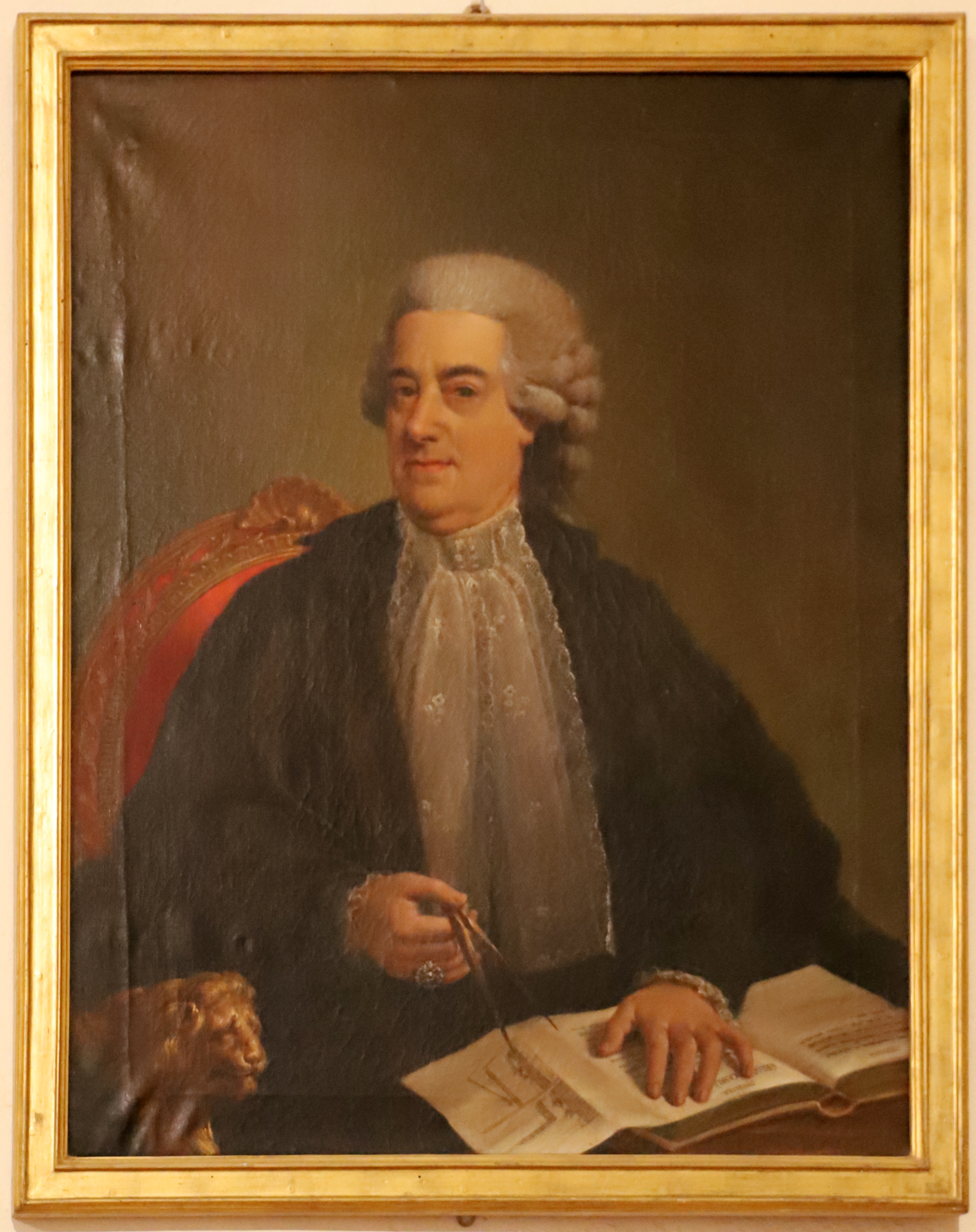
Count Gregorio Filippo Maria Casali Bentivoglio Paleotti, the last representative of the senatorial branch.

A prominent member of this second branch, Count Gregorio Filippo Maria Casali Bentivoglio Paleotti (1721–1802) taught military architecture and mechanics at the University of Bologna. His work on geometry, mechanics and ballistics helped spread Newtonian principles within Bolognese scientific culture. Appointed senator in 1764, he served as gonfalonier of justice in 1766. He presided over the Institute of Sciences before becoming rector of the university; the last representative of the senatorial branch, he bequeathed his property and archives to the Isolani Lupari.

=== Casali of Monticelli ===
The Monticelli branch descends from the diplomat Gregorio Casali. In 1567, his son Michele, Count of Castelvetro Piacentino, received a share in the lordship of Monticelli d'Ongina from the Duke of Parma, establishing this branch in the Piacenza area.

In the 17th century, Francesco Casali, Michele's great-grandson, served as Duke Ranuccio II Farnese's ambassador to the courts of France and Spain. In 1660, the duke created him Marquess of Monticelli d'Ongina, with the title transmissible to his male descendants. His son, Marquess Giuseppe Casali, subsequently represented the Duke of Parma at the court of Philip V of Spain and at the imperial court in Vienna.

In the mid-19th century, amid the upheavals of the Risorgimento and Italian migration across the Mediterranean, a cadet branch of Monticelli settled in Tunisia and then in France, where it survives. The main branch, however, remained in Italy on its estates and retained Monticelli d'Ongina Castle until 1957.

Another branch, descended from another son of the first marquess, settled in Florence and later adopted the name Casali della Vipera. One offshoot moved to Lucca in the 18th century, then to French Algeria in the 19th century, before settling in France.

=== Casali of Rome and Casali del Drago ===
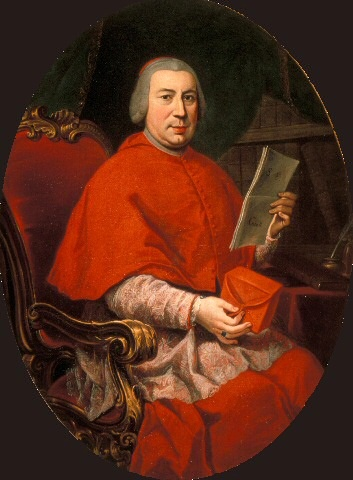
Cardinal Antonio Casali, around 1775.

Present in Rome from the 15th to the early 20th century, the Roman branch included Giovanni Battista Casali (1578–1648), the author of works on ancient rites, ancient Egypt and the splendour of Rome, who assembled an important collection of antiquities in his palace in the Campus Martius.

Antonio Casali (1715–1787), Governor of Rome and Vice-Camerlengo, was created a cardinal by Clement XIV. Through his work in the papal administration, Cardinal Antonio Casali contributed notably to the cadastral reform of the Papal States.

In 1814, Maddalena Casali, daughter and heiress of the Roman branch, married Marquess Stanislao Del Drago; their descendants placed the Casali name and arms before those of the Del Drago, giving rise to the Casali del Drago. Marquess Giovanni Battista Casali del Drago (1838–1908), titular Latin Patriarch of Constantinople and later a cardinal, served as Camerlengo of the College of Cardinals from 1901 to 1902 and took part in the conclave of 1903, which elected Pius X. His death marked the extinction of the branch in the male line. His sister Maria Casali del Drago (1836–1927) transmitted the marquessate of Riofreddo to her Pelagallo descendants.

== Simplified genealogies ==
Casali of Cortona — attested in 1217; lordship 1325–1409
│
├──→ Casali of Bologna — documented from 1434
│ ├──→ First senatorial branch — 1525–1604 †
│ └──→ Casali of Monticelli d'Ongina — 1567–present
│ ├──→ Second senatorial branch — 1604–1802 †
│ ├──→ Casali of Florence, later known as Casali della Vipera — 17th–18th centuries
│ │ └──→ Lucca branch — 18th century; ⇒ became French — 19th century–present
│ └──→ French branch of Monticelli — 19th century–present
│
└──→ Casali of Rome — 15th century–1814
└──⇒ Casali del Drago — 1814–1908 †
└──→ Pelagallo descendants — transmission of the marquessate of Riofreddo through the female line

→ offshoot of a branch; ⇒ transformation or continuation in a new form; † extinction in the male line.

== Notable members ==
- Uguccio Casali, known as the Elder, podestà of Cortona and Arezzo and captain of the people of Pisa.
- Ranieri II Casali (died 1351), lord of Cortona and Pierle.
- Castellano Casali, doctor of canon law and apostolic secretary.
- Battista Casali, humanist and professor of rhetoric at the University of Rome.
- Gregorio Casali (1496–1536), Count of Castelvetro Piacentino, knight and Henry VIII's resident ambassador to the Holy See.
- Giambattista Casali (died 1536), Bishop of Belluno and English ambassador to Venice.
- Paolo Casali (died 1531), papal chamberlain and apostolic nuncio to Henry VIII.
- Francesco Casali (born 1502), Venetian captain and representative of the King of Hungary at the Holy See.
- Count Andrea Casali (died 1550), the family's first senator in Bologna and holder of the county of Montegiorgio.
- Alessandro Casali (1533–1582), papal ambassador to Philip II and Bishop of Vigevano.
- Giovanni Battista Casali (1578–1648), Roman antiquarian and scholar.
- Francesco Casali, Farnese ambassador to France and Spain and first Marquess of Monticelli in 1660.
- Cardinal Antonio Casali (1715–1787), Governor of Rome and Vice-Camerlengo.
- Count Gregorio Filippo Maria Casali Bentivoglio Paleotti (1721–1802), senator, scholar and rector of the University of Bologna.
- Cardinal Giovanni Battista Casali del Drago (1838–1908), Marquess of Riofreddo, titular Latin Patriarch of Constantinople, and Camerlengo of the College of Cardinals (1901–1902).
- Marquess Alessandro Casali (1894–1917), infantry captain, posthumously awarded the Gold Medal of Military Valor.

== Titles and lordships ==
- Prince of Mazzano
- Prince of Antuni
- Marquess of Pastina
- Marquess of Monticelli d'Ongina
- Marquess of Riofreddo
- Count Palatine of the Lateran
- Count of Montegiorgio
- Count of Castelvetro Piacentino
- Count of the Ripe del Canale di Reno
- Lord of Cortona
- Lord of Pierle

== Coats of arms ==
Branch	Arms	Blazon
Casali of Cortona	Arms of the Casali of Cortona	Or, three bars wavy Azure.
Casali of Bologna	Arms of the Casali of Bologna	Per fess: first, Or a lion Azure holding in its dexter forepaw a fleur-de-lis Gules; second, Gules three mullets of eight points Or, two and one.
Casali of Monticelli d'Ongina and Florence	Arms of the Casali of Monticelli d'Ongina and Florence	Per fess: first, Gules a lion Or holding in its dexter forepaw a fleur-de-lis Azure; second, Azure three mullets of eight points Or, two and one.
French branch of Monticelli	Arms of the French branch of Monticelli	Per pale: first, Or three bars wavy Azure; second, per fess, in chief Gules a lion Or holding in its dexter forepaw a fleur-de-lis Azure, and in base Azure three mullets of eight points Or, two and one.
Casali of Rome	Arms of the Casali of Rome	Azure, a tower Argent, its door and windows Sable and its battlements Or, surmounted by a dove Argent holding an olive branch Vert.
Casali del Drago	Arms of the Casali del Drago	Per pale: first, Azure a tower Argent, its door and windows Sable and its battlements Or, surmounted by a dove Argent holding an olive branch Vert; second, Azure a winged dragon Or, crowned of the same.

== See also ==
- Cortona
- Senate of Bologna
- Monticelli d'Ongina
- Henry VIII
- House of Farnese
- Duchy of Parma and Piacenza
- San Domenico, Bologna
- Italian nobility
