= Gennaro Maria Sarnelli =

Blessed Gennaro Maria Sarnelli CSsR
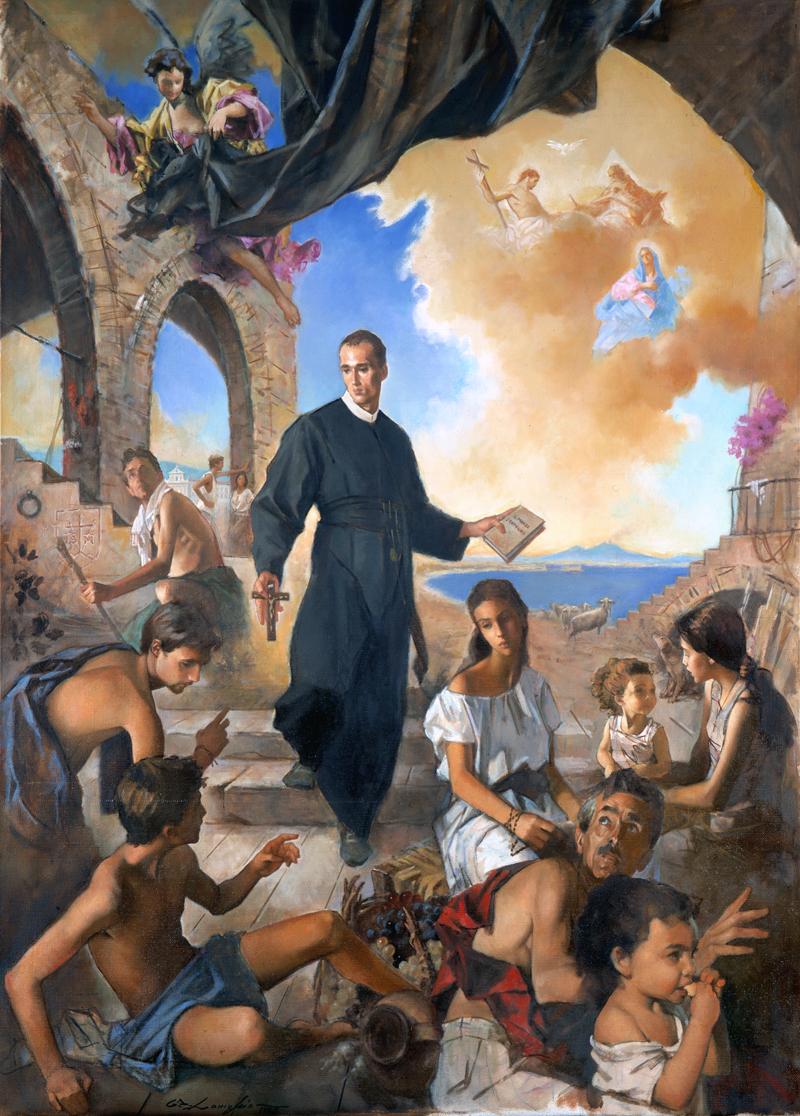
- Painting unveiled at the beatification
- Born: 12 September 1702; Naples
- Died: 30 June 1744 (aged 41); Naples
- Venerated in: Roman Catholic Church
- Beatified: 12 May 1996, Saint Peter's Square, Vatican City by Pope John Paul II
- Feast: 30 June

Gennaro Maria Sarnelli (12 September 1702 – 30 June 1744) was an Italian Roman Catholic priest and a professed member from the Redemptorists. Sarnelli was one of Alphonsus Maria de' Liguori's earliest companions and a prolific writer on a range of religious topics. He wanted to become a Jesuit though was dissuaded from this before working in the Hospital of the Incurables where his call to the priesthood blossomed. His apostolic zeal knew no limits: he preached missions and aided his friend Liguori in his work; he tended to the sick and helped to get girls out of prostitution despite the threats levelled against him.

Sarnelli's fame for holiness was a well-known fact during his life. His beatification cause opened in 1861 in Naples; formal introduction came in 1874 and he was named as Venerable on 2 December 1906. Pope John Paul II beatified him in mid-1996.

== Life ==
Gennaro Maria Sarnelli was born in Naples on 12 September 1702 as the fourth of eight children (two females and six males) to Angelo Sarnelli (the Baron of Ciorani) and Caterina Scoppa in the Zapata Palace in the Piazza Trieste e Trento. One brother was Domenico and another was the priest Andrea who was next to him in age. His great-uncle was Girolamo Sarnelli and his uncle was the Bishop of Muro Lucano Andrea Sarnelli (d. 15-09-1707).

From his childhood he was noted for being modest as well as for his self-denial and his great diligence in his studies. He was obedient to his parents though when he perceived he was disobedient he begged their pardon and would either kiss their hand or throw himself at their feet. He often visited the church of Saint Francis Xavier as a child. In 1716 he desired to become a Jesuit but his father objected due to his age and directed him to learn law instead; the beatification of John Francis Regis was also an influence in his decision. He studied jurisprudence and earned his doctorate in civil and canon law in 1722.

Sarnelli became quite successful and was enrolled in the Congregation of the Knights of the Legal and Medical Professions directed by the Pious Workers of Saint Nicholas of Toledo. One of the rules of this association was visiting the sick in the Hospital of the Incurables. It was while tending to the ill in the hospital that his call to become a priest developed to the point he could not ignore it.

In September 1728 he abandoned the bar and decided to become a priest after commencing his ecclesial studies; Cardinal Francesco Pignatelli incardinated him as a cleric to the parish of Santa Anna di Palazzo. His zeal showed itself at once in his labours for children whom he catechized with wonderful success. On 4 June 1729 he became a boarder at the Collegio della Santa Famiglia to continue his studies under more peaceful conditions though left on 8 April 1730 to enter the novitiate of the Congregation of the Apostolic Missions. He concluded this probation on 28 May 1731. He was ordained to the priesthood on 8 June 1732 and became a member of the Propaganda of Naples which was a congregation of secular priests devoted to apostolic work. He distributed his wealth to the poor. Cardinal Pignatelli assigned him to serve as the Director of Religious Instruction in the parish of Saints Francis and Matthew in the Spanish quarter. He also visited the old people in the Hospice of Saint Gennaro and those condemned to death who were ill in the hospital at the docks. It was at this time that he developed a friendship with Alphonsus Maria de' Liguori after the two first met in Chiaiano.

In June 1733 he travelled to Scala to aid a friend at a mission at Ravello and he met up with and became one of the earliest companions to Liguori in founding the Redemptorists which he joined in 1733. The pair worked together and gave missions along the coast of Amalfi from 1735 to April 1736 (Easter; missions in Salerno and Amalfi) when Sarnelli's health started to decline. He had to return to Naples where he spent the next decade in a poor apartment with one religious as a companion. In 1741 he prepared for the planned canonical visitation of Cardinal Giuseppe Spinelli and participated in missions at Casali. Having become aware of the rampant corruption of young women, he decided to direct all his work against prostitution. But doing this work earned him threats from the criminal element that made profit from this. In April 1744 he stopped preaching altogether because his health became so dire.

Sarnelli died at 10:00am on 30 June 1744. His old friend Liguori was present at his bedside and noted a sweet odour that remained in the room even long after Sarnelli was buried; the religious Francesco Tartaglione and the novice Francisco Romito were also present. His brother Domenico was so overcome with emotion he did not want to leave the room where his brother's remains were. He was buried on 2 July 1744 in the parish church of Santa Maria dell'Aiuto in Naples (in the San Nicola chapel) though later reinterred in the Redemptorist church of Santi Alfonso e Antonio at Tarsia in Naples. His remains were moved again on 25 October 1994 to the Redemptorist church of La Santissima Trinità in Ciorani.

== Beatification ==
The beatification cause opened in the Naples archdiocese with Cardinal Sisto Riario Sforza opening the informative process in 1861. The formal introduction to the cause came under Pope Pius IX on 3 December 1874 and Sarnelli became titled as a Servant of God. The confirmation of his life of heroic virtue allowed for Pope Pius X to name him as Venerable on 2 December 1906.

Sarnelli's beatification depended on one miraculous healing to be verified and approved. One such case was investigated in a diocesan process with the Congregation for the Causes of Saints validating the process and receiving all the medical documents. The medical experts consulting the Congregation's approved this case on 1 June 1995 as did the theologians on 13 October 1995 and the Congregation on 5 December 1995. Pope John Paul II issued his approval to this miracle on 12 January 1996 and beatified Sarnelli in Saint Peter's Square on 12 May 1996. The postulator for this cause is Antonio Marrazzo CSsR.

== Writings ==
In his writings he pointed out that the ministers of state bore great responsibilities that could not be ignored, while the effect of his exhortations on public life aided him in his pastoral mission but also earned him praise from the faithful. He insisted on meditation as vital for perseverance and demonstrated that all could reach this and make it a practice. He wrote so much on this - and promoted it so much - that after his death Pope Benedict XIV issued an apostolic letter granting indulgences to meditation on 16 December 1746.

His old friend St. Alphonsus Liguori was his first biographer.

A complete edition of Sarnelli's works, Opere complete del Ven. Servo di Dio, P.D. Gennaro Maria Sarnelli was published in 1889 at Naples, by the Tipografia Largo S. Martino, No. 4, as follows:

- Il Mondo santificato (1737), 2 volumes
- Il Mondo reformato, 2 volumes
- L'Anima illuminata
- L'Anima desolata
- Il Cristiano illuminato, dirretto ed ammaestrato
- Il Cristiano santificato
- Le Glorie e Grandezze della Divina Madre
- Devozioni pratiche per onorare la SS. Trinita e Maria Santissima e Devozioni per apparecchio ad una buona morte
- Lettere spirituali
- Della discrezione degli Spiriti
- L'Ecclesiastico Santificato
- Contro il vizio della bestemmia
- Ragioni Cattoliche, legali e politiche, contro il meretricio
- Vita del Ven. Servo di Dio P.D. Gennaro Sarnelli del P. François Dumortier.

Not included in above is the two-volume, La via facile e sicura del Paradiso (1738) cited in St. Alphonsus Liguouri, Apparecchio alla Morte, Cons. 11.1, published anonymously.
