= Casali =

Casali is an Italian surname.

== Family ==
- Casali family, an Italian noble family originating in Cortona, Tuscany, whose history dates back to the early 13th century

== Notable people ==
Notable people with the surname include:

- Andrea Casali (1705–1784), Italian painter
- Arianna Farfaletti Casali (born 1976), former Italian-born Swiss female pole vaulter
- Charles Casali (1923–2014), Swiss footballer
- Curt Casali (born 1988), American baseball player
- Giovanni Battista Casali (1715–1792), Italian musician
- Giovanni Battista Casali del Drago (1838–1908), Italian cardinal
- Giovanni di Casali (c. 1320–after 1374), Italian mathematician and theologian
- Giulio Casali (born 1932), Sammarinese professional football player and manager
- Italo Casali (1940–2019), Sammarinese former sports shooter
- Kim Casali (1941–1997), New Zealand cartoonist
- Casali brothers, Dario and Milo Casali
- Libero Casali (born 1939), Sammarinese former sports shooter
- Paolo Casali, Italian-American academic and immunologist
- Stefano Casali (born 1962), Sammarinese racewalker
- Tino Casali (born 1995), Austrian football player

== See also ==
- Casale (disambiguation)
- Casalis (sometimes plural casali), a medieval settlement type
