= Arbos =

Italian agriculture machinery company

ARBOS
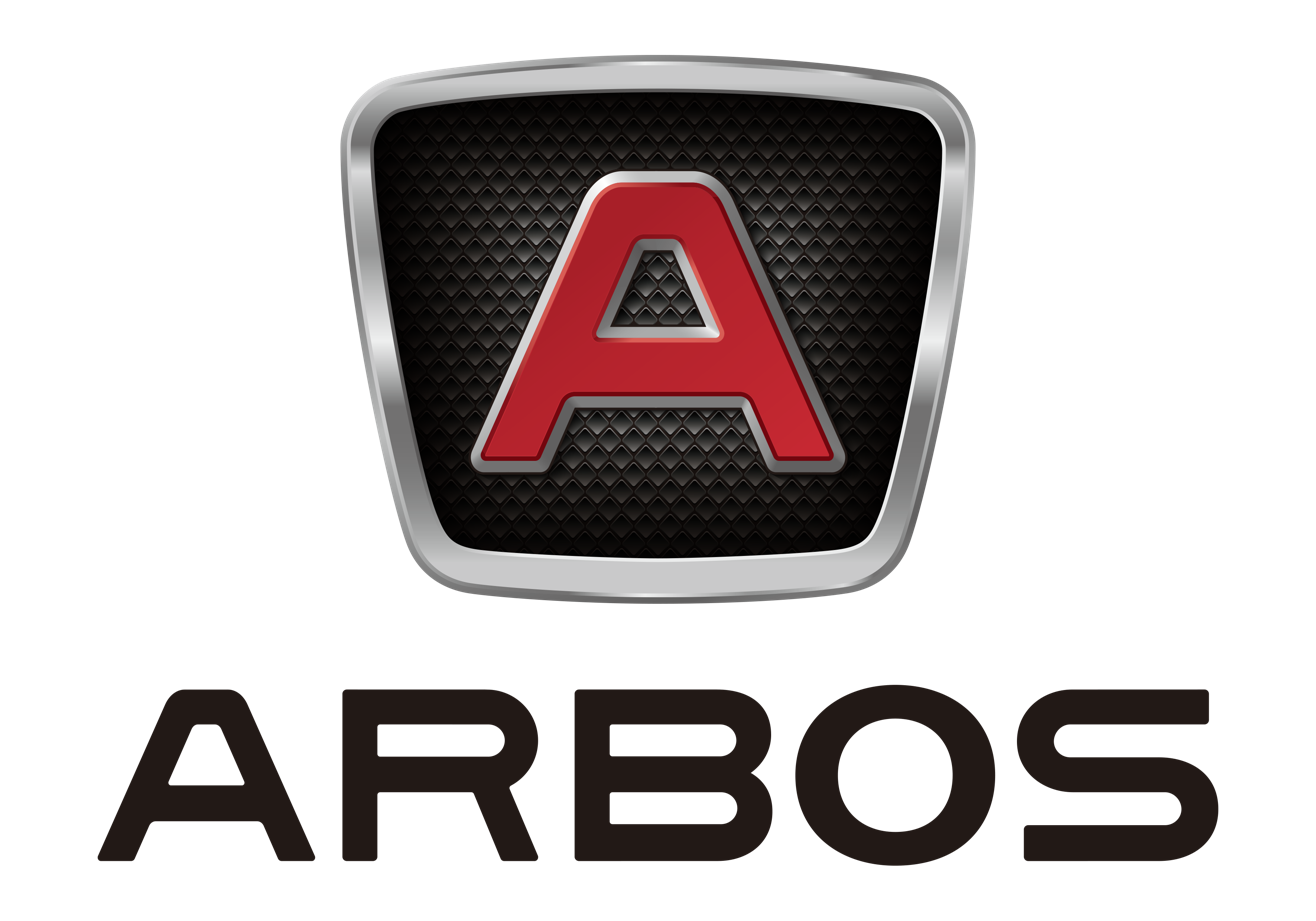
- Industry: Agricultural machinery
- Founded: 1954 in Piacenza
- Headquarters: Migliarina of Carpi, Modena, Italy
- Products: Tractors; Fertilizer equipment Seeding equipment Sprayers
- Parent: Lovol Heavy Industry ltd
- Website: arbos.com

ARBOS is an Italian agricultural machinery company located in Migliarina di Carpi, Modena, Italy. It was founded in 1954 in Piacenza, Italy. ARBOS manufactures tractors, fertilizer equipment, seeding equipment and sprayers.

== History ==
ARBOS, a bicycle manufacturer, took its name from the acronym of two Piacenza businessmen, Araldi and Boselli. In 1952 it was bought by Bubba S.A., a company that originated from SAFI in Piacenza, which in 1930 had taken over «Pietro Bubba & C.», the company that produced the Bubba agricultural tractors.

=== The Arbos-Bubba period ===
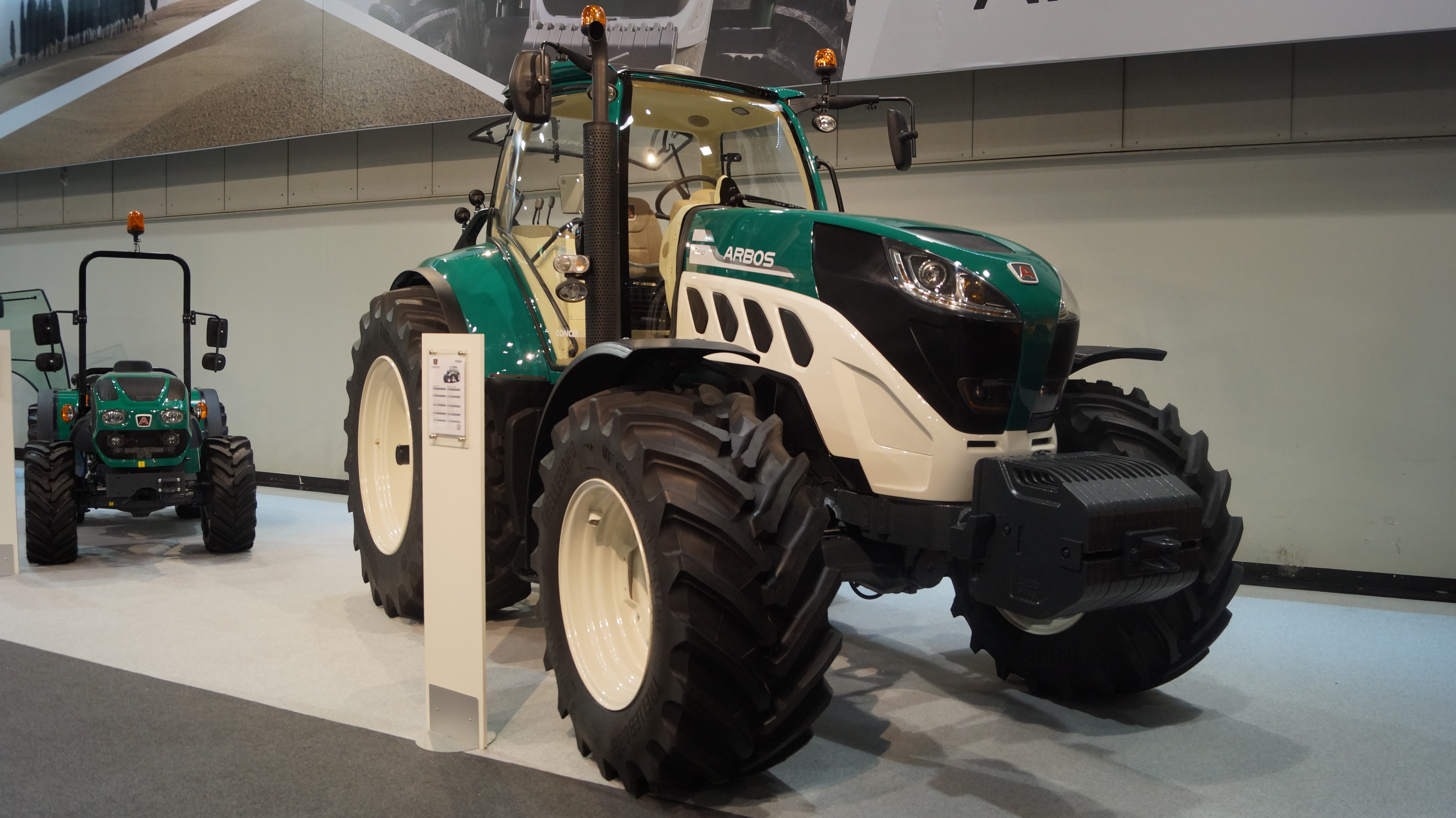
ARBOS 7260

In 1954 the company became Arbos-Bubba and launched a wheeled tractor with a 35 HP Perkins P4TA diesel engine, followed by a tracked version, with a choice of two engines, the next year: Perkins P4TA or the 32 HP Deutz F2L514. The tractors were not very successful: by the end of December 1955 it had sold only 33 wheeled versions and 9 tracked. In 1956 the brand dropped the Bubba name, and became simply Arbos. It produced the 100 C combine harvesters, wheeled and tracked, and the Allodola 650 with a diesel Fiat engine. These were followed by the 1000 Super and the 750 Super.

=== From the economic boom to the seventies ===
In 1960 Arbos-Bubba became Arbos Spa.Arbos began producing combine harvesters in the new plant in San Lazzaro, close to Piacenza. Three years later they produced the new 1000 Major 87 HP, with the new olive green livery.

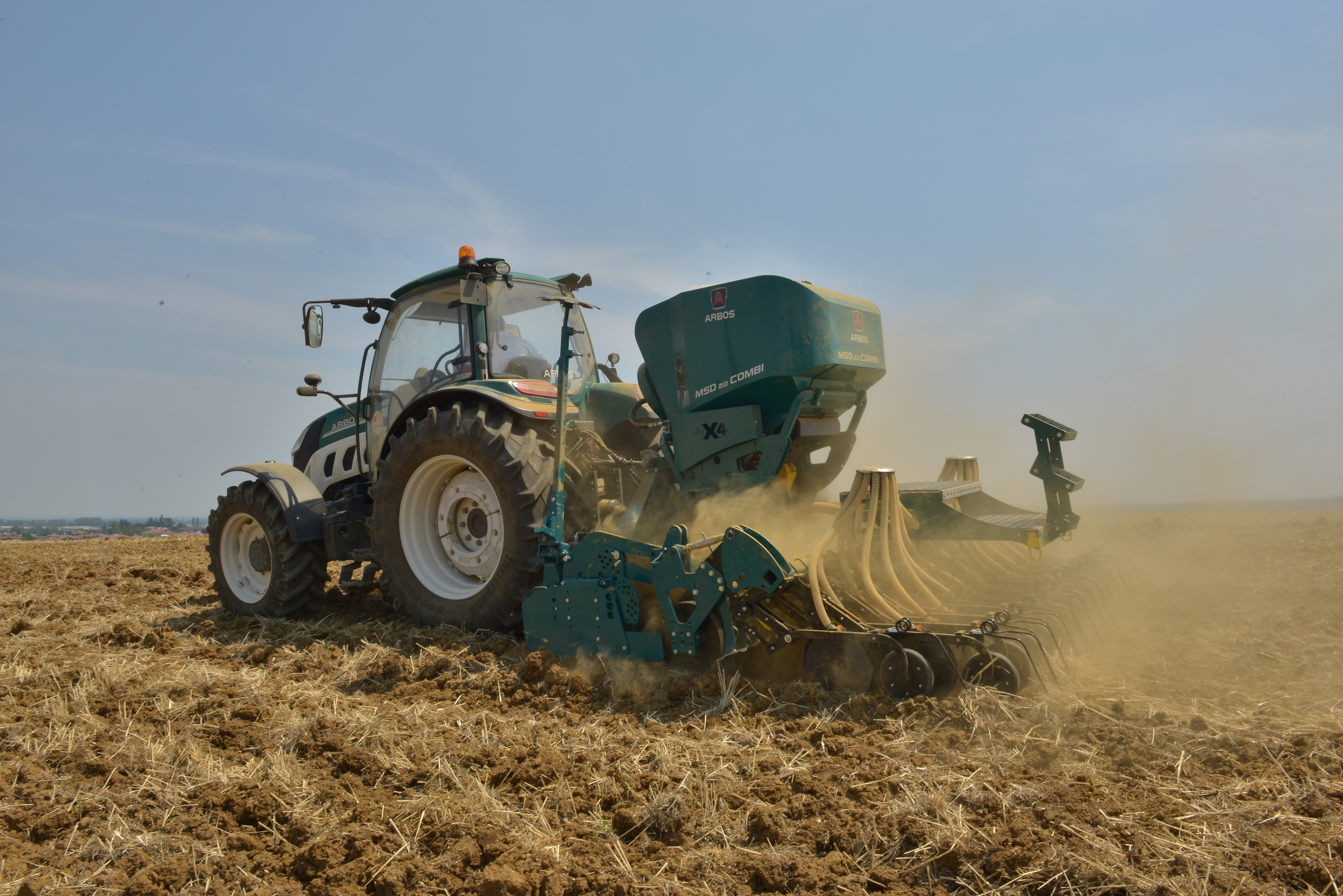
ARBOS 5115

In 1964 Arbos Spa was taken over by the American company White. The following year they released the flagship of European combine harvesters, the 1220. In a few years the range grew with new models: 1220, 780, Record and then 120 Pantera, 165 Tigre, 100 Lince and 125 Giaguaro. In 1971 they launched the Pantera 7 Colli, the first self-levelling combine harvester in the world, with levelling on 4 sides, longitudinal and transversal.

In 1972 Arbos Spa became a branch of White and the following year it launched the self-leveller 100 AL. On 20 November 1975 White Arbos Spa stopped trading and was wound up on the 31 December of that year.

=== The new Arbos ===
In 1976 Arbos Spa was bought by the Magni brothers and renamed Nuova Arbos. The new company presented the self-levelling 565 AL and started producing two new self-levelling machines: the 565 A-4-L and the 705 A-4-L and two flat-land machines, 140 - 160.

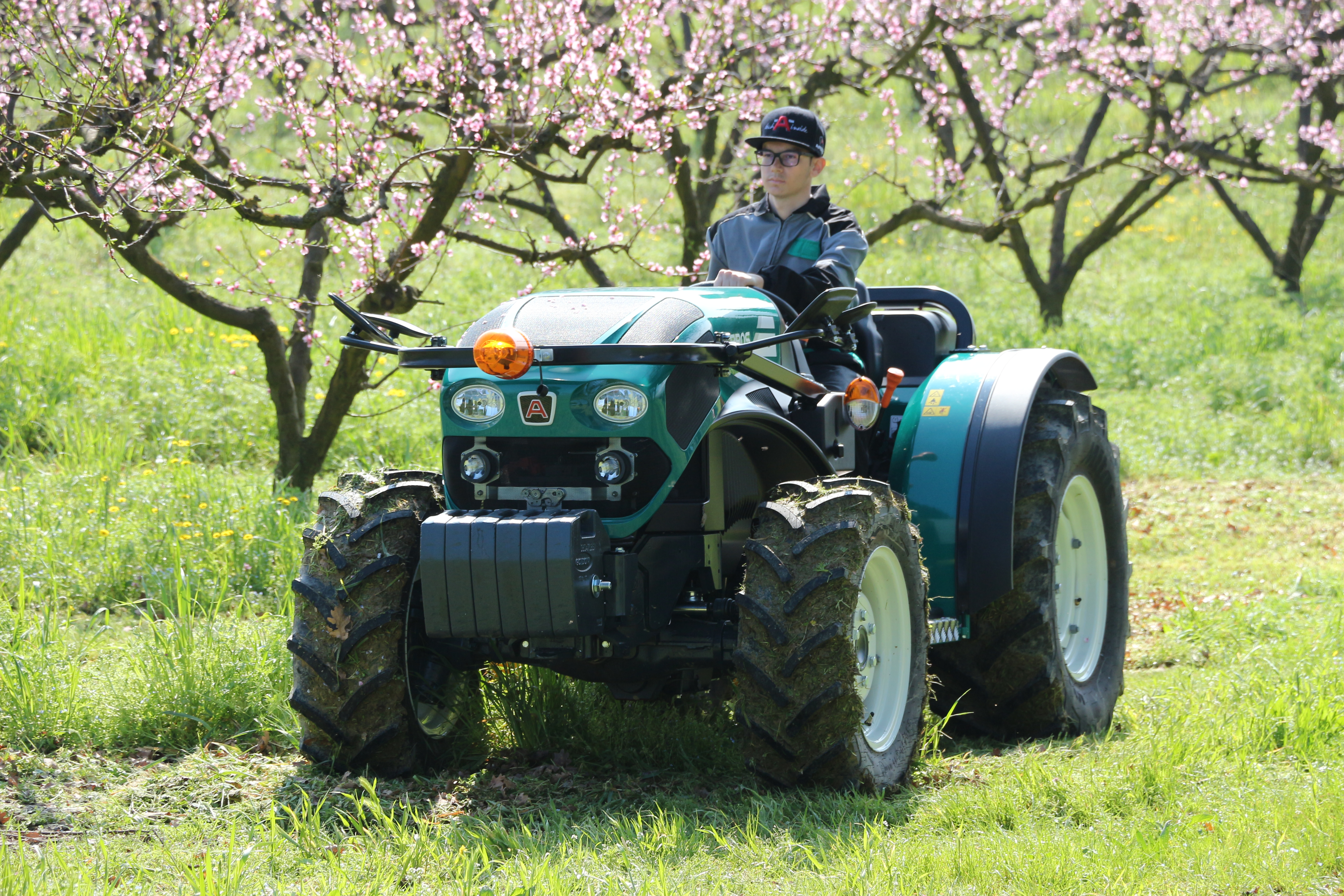
ARBOS 4110Q

In 1983 the Nuova Arbos changed hands once again, going back to its old name Arbos Spa, for the production of combine harvesters for wheat, rice and corn: 100 – 125 – 140 – 160 - 565 A4L – 705 A4L.

In 1985 Arbos SPA took over Italo Svizzera of ZolaPredosa (BO), to produce single row and double row beet harvesters. A year later it launched two new self-levelling combine harvesters, the 400 AL and the 200 AL. Subsequently, the company started focusing on updating the top of the range machines, by launching the 800 and 1000. The 600 was designed, but only one model was actually built.

In 1994, four years short of its centenary, Arbos folded definitively.

=== Rebirth ===
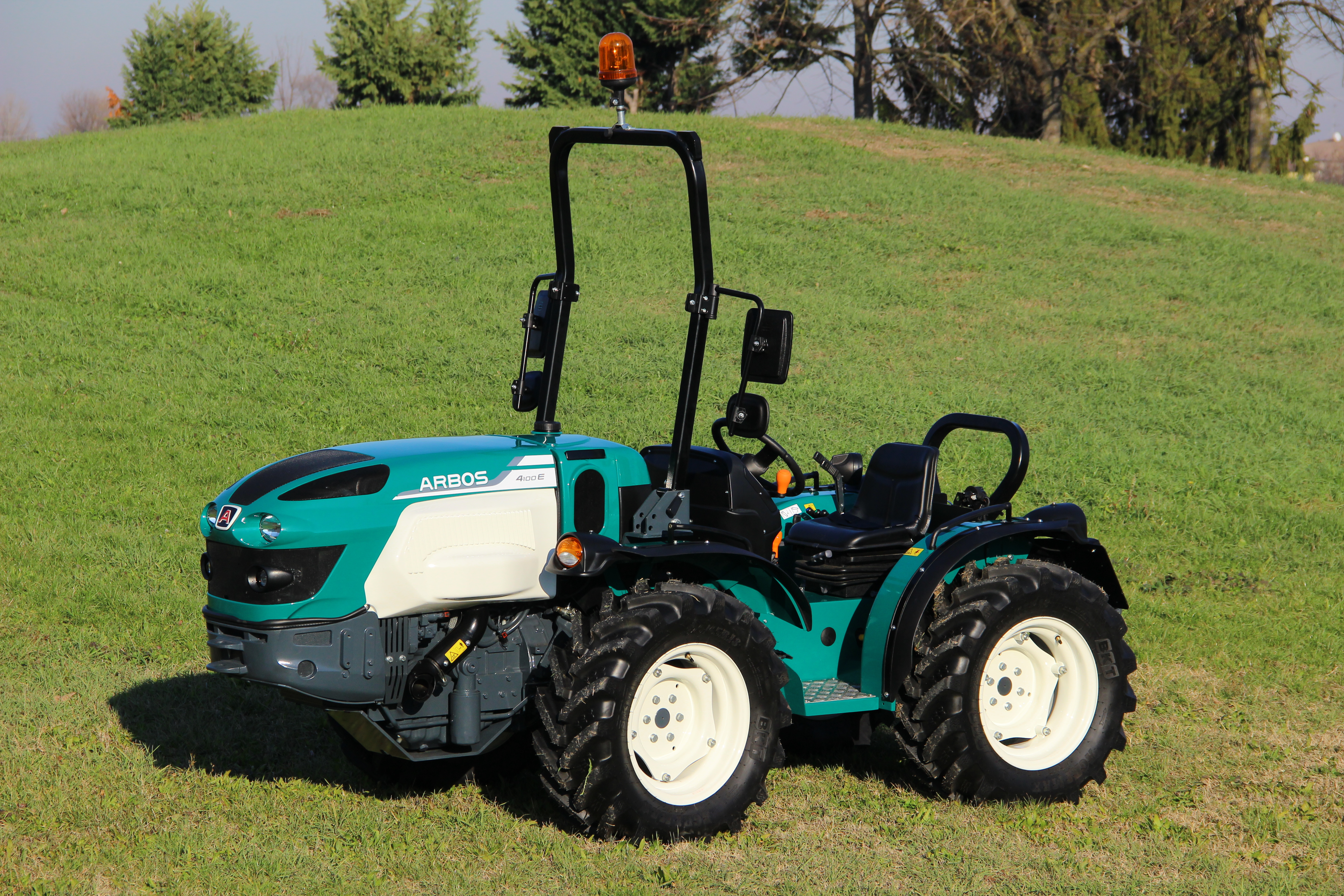
ARBOS 4100E - equal size wheel

In 2011 Lovol Heavy Industry ltd, Chinese manufacturer of tractors, agricultural machines and earthmoving machinery, opened a research and development centre in Calderara di Reno (BO), to coordinate its activities in Europe. After taking over Arbos and Bubba, this new centre became the headquarters of a new holding, Lovol Arbos Group Spa, whose aim was to design three tractor platforms from 100 to 270 HP and recuperate the industrial know-how of Arbos combine harvesters.

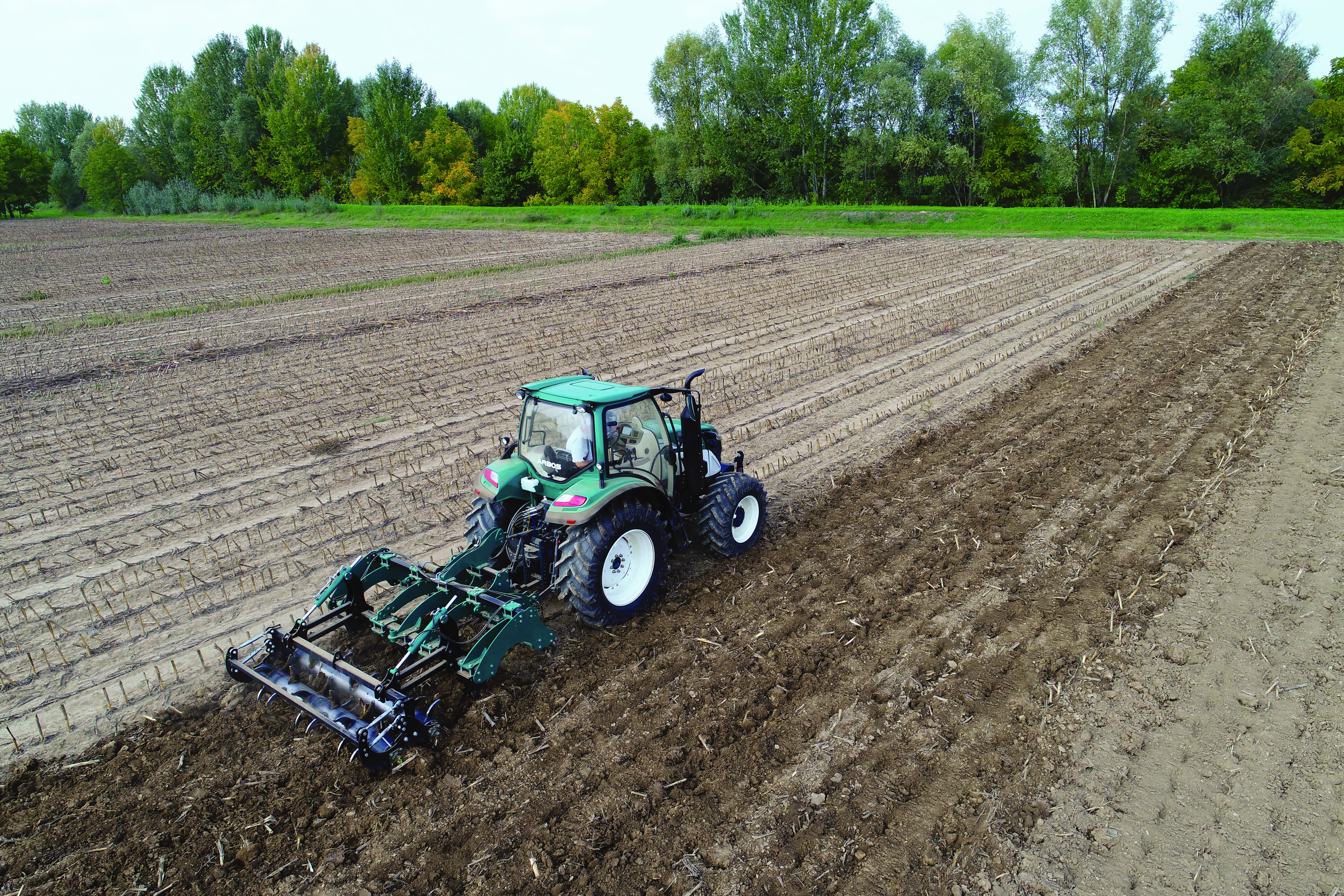
ARBOS 5130 and subsoiler ROCK

In 2015, ARBOS Group launched a major acquisition plan designed to consolidate the foundations of a project that would shortly lead to the production of an integrated full-line solution within agricultural mechanization. The goal is to establish ARBOS as an international brand of reference for farmers around the world and for the entire agronomic cycle by introducing products compatible with the latest cultivation, conservative farming, and precision seeding techniques, moving from compact and highly specialized tractors to the creation of a full range for open field applications. For this reason, in 2015, two large companies joined the ARBOS Group family. The first to be acquired in January is MaterMacc, a company from Pordenone specializing in the production of agricultural equipment, followed in December of the same year by Goldoni S.p.A., a historic company from the Emilia region producing tractors for orchards. These two companies serve to represent the strategic starting points for investment for the Group's industrial launch. In 2016, the Friulian company rolls out a new recruitment plan, as well as a number of major industrial renovations that result in the facility being extended by a further 55,000 m^{2}. The plant at Migliarina di Carpi is also updated, with a focus on upgrading the assembly lines, renovating the offices, and building a new center entirely devoted to Engineering, transferred from Calderara di Reno to the new headquarters in the Modena province.

=== Since 2015 ===
During Agritechnica 2017, the Full Line of tractors and equipment in green livery is officially presented. The ARBOS brand is therefore ready to sell on the European market with a range of products that can support the entire agronomic cycle, from working the land to harvesting. 2018 saw large improvement of the range of high power tractors and the development of advanced equipment for precision seeding.

The collaboration between Arbos and MaterMacc ended in 2022.

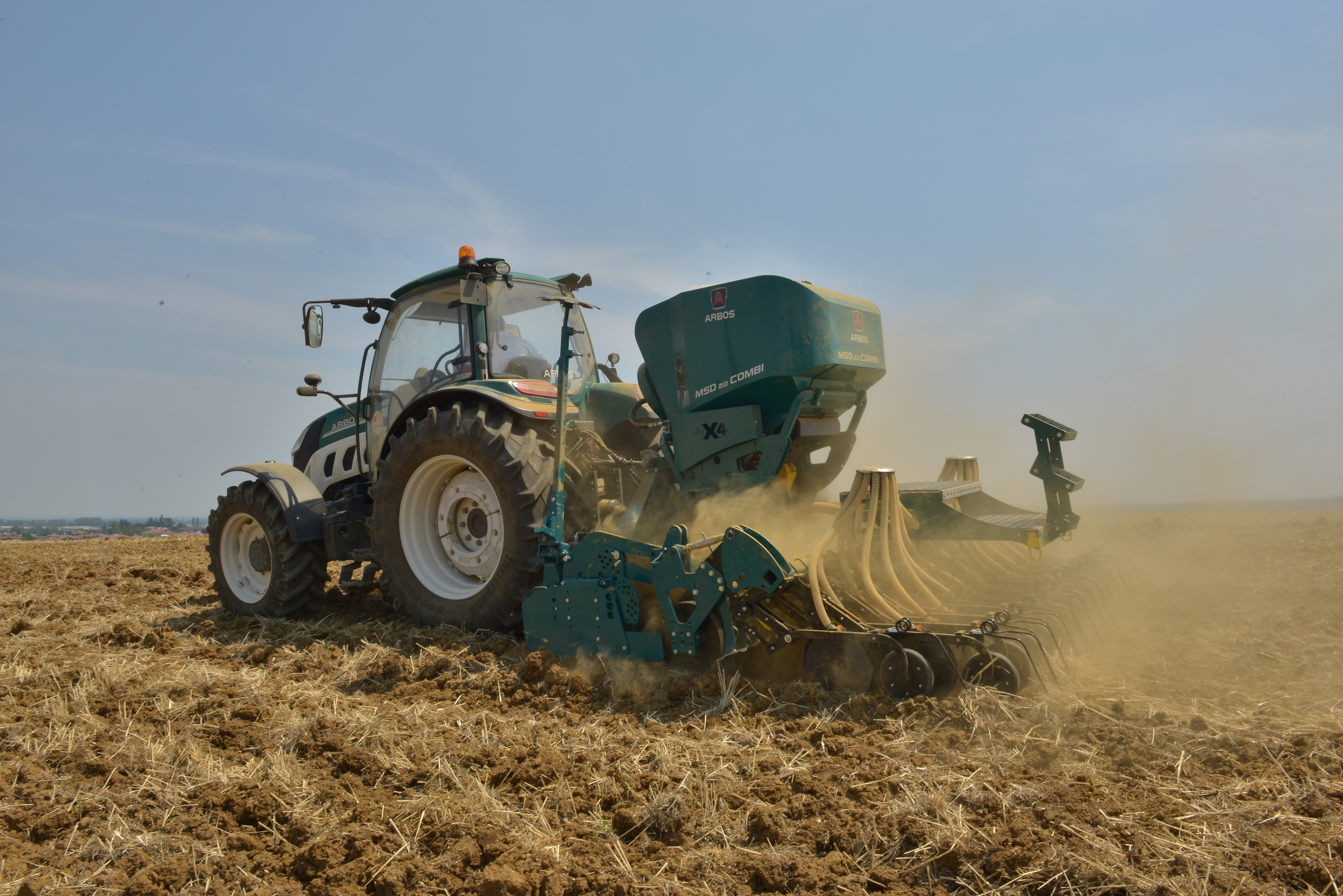
ARBOS 5115

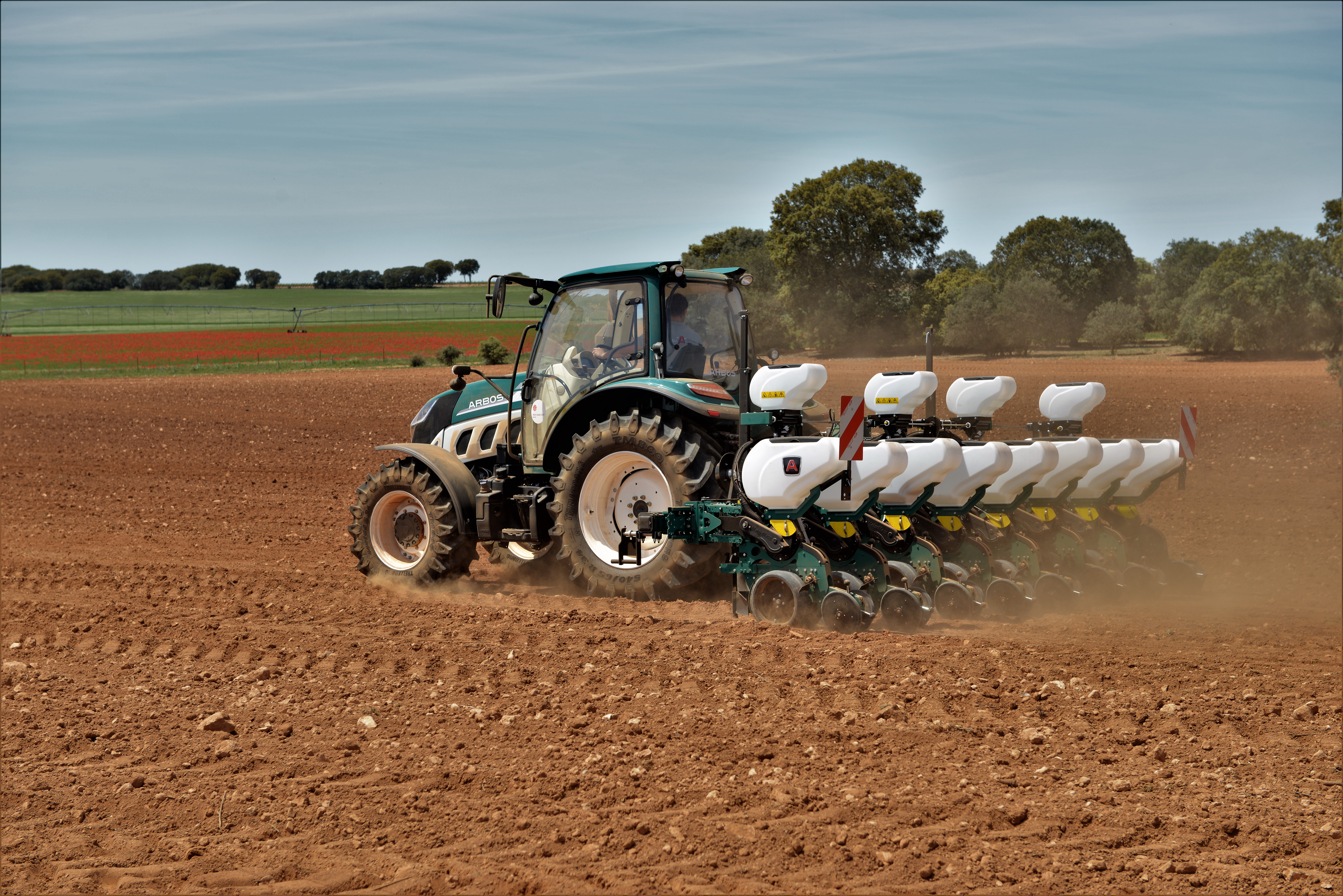
ARBOS 5100

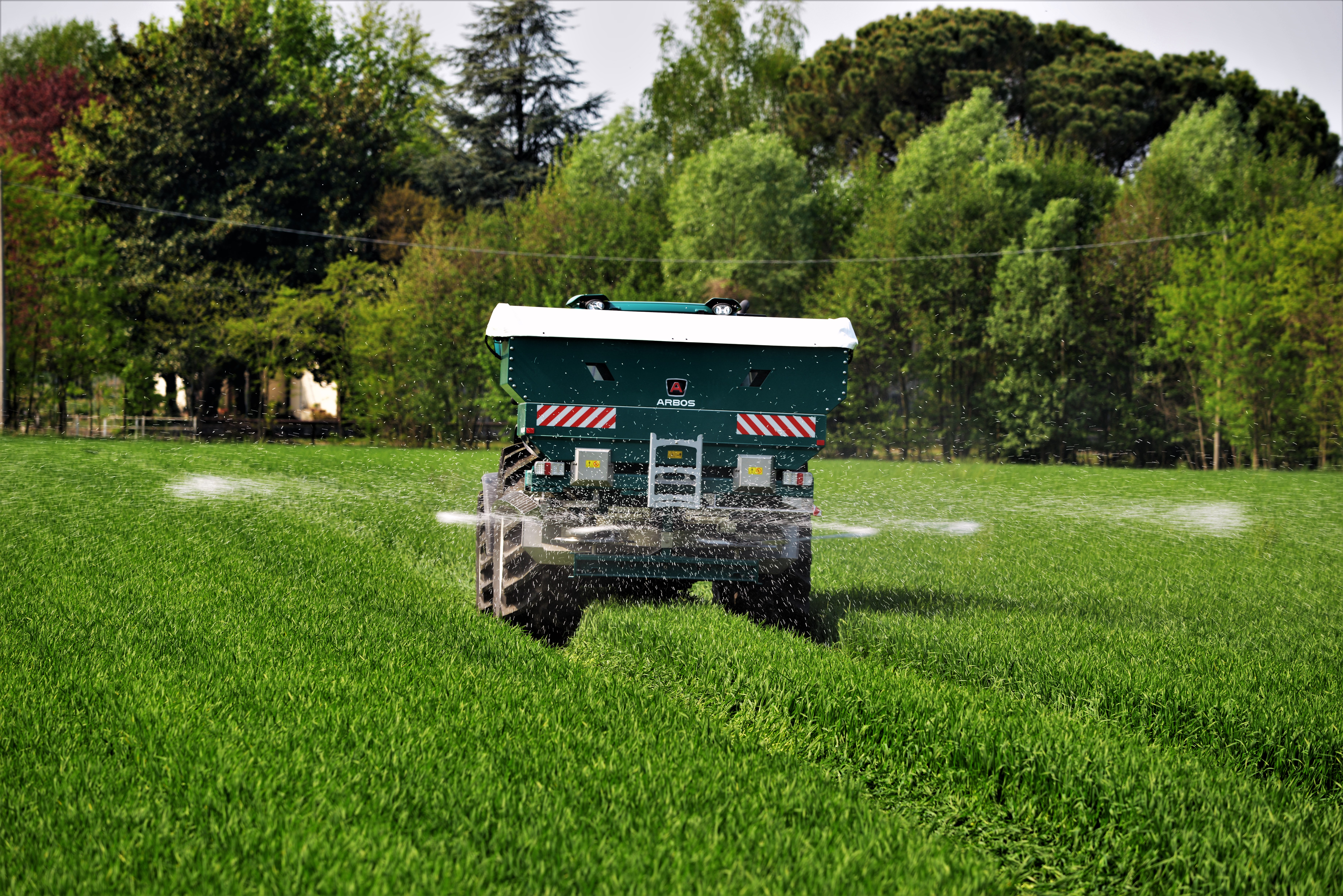
ARBOS fertilizer

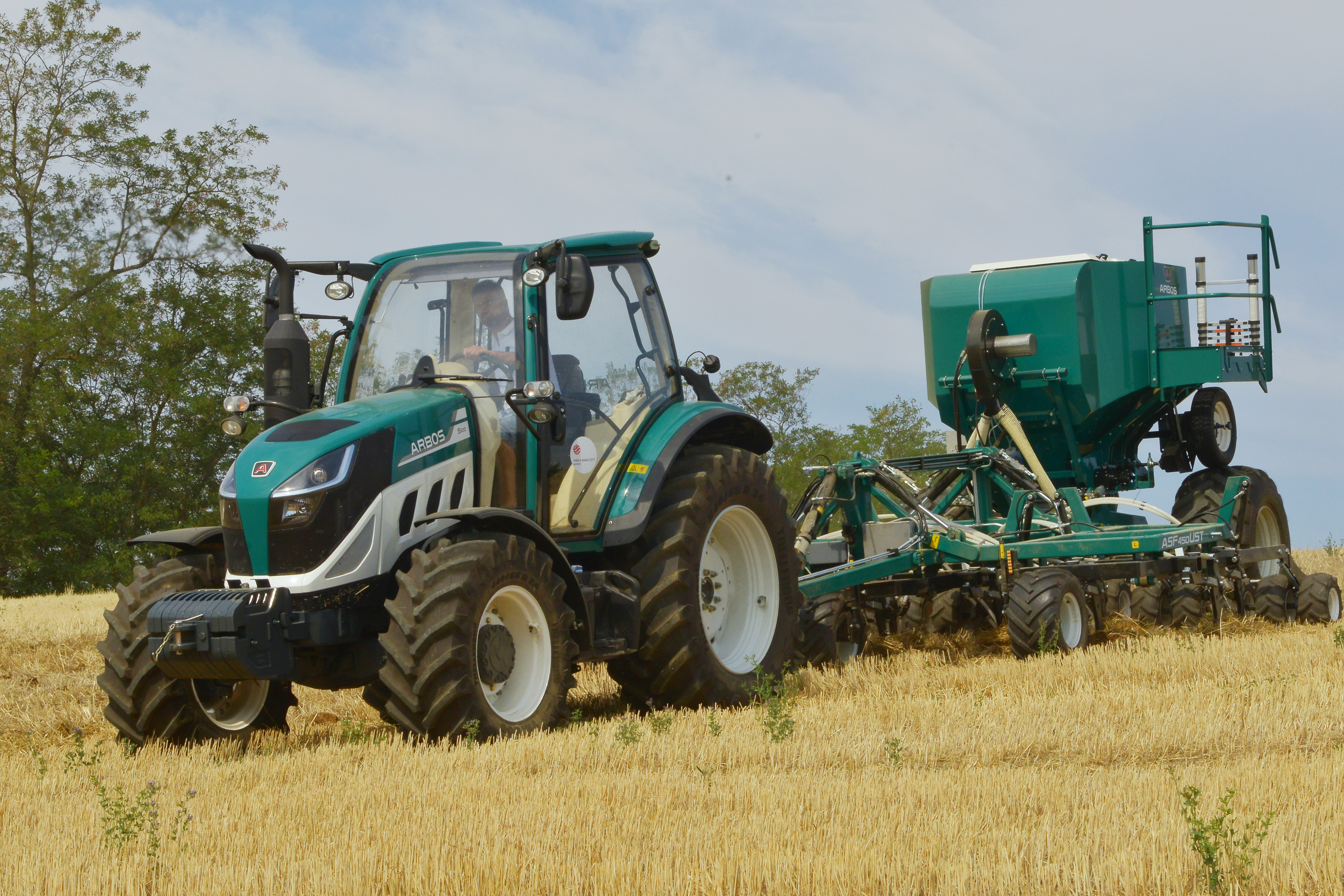
ARBOS 5100

== Models produced ==
Combine harvesters	Year
MT 1500 “Bubba”	1948
MT 52	1952
100 A	1953
100 B	1954
100 C	1956
Allodola	1956
1000 Super	1957–62
750 Super	1958–66
1000 Major	1963–67
760 Super	1964–65
Record 60	1964–67
1220	1965–71
780	1966–70
Record 65	1967–68
Record Super	1967–69
Record	1969
120 Pantera	1970–73
165 Tigre	1970–74
120 Pantera Colli	1971–73
100 AL	1973–76
100 Lince	1973–85
125 Giaguaro	1973–90
565 A-4-L	1976–85
705 A-4L	1976–85
160	1979–88
140	1981–82
400 AL	1983–92
130	1984
125/84	1984–90
110	1985–87
200 AL	1985–92
800	1989–92
1000	1989–92
600	1991

== Current range ==
Open field tractors

- 7260 (260-280 HP)
- 5100 (110 HP)
- 5115 (122 HP)
- 5130 (136 HP)
- 2025 (25 HP)
- 2035 (35 HP)
- 3055 (50 HP)

Specialized tractors

- ARBOS 3040 (38 HP)
- ARBOS 3050 (48 HP)
- ARBOS 4060F (49 HP)
- ARBOS 4080F (75 HP)
- ARBOS 4090Q (80 HP)
- ARBOS 4100Q (91 HP)
- ARBOS 4110Q (102 HP)
- ARBOS 4090F (80 HP)
- ARBOS 4100F (91 HP)
- ARBOS 4110F (102 HP)
- ARBOS 4090AF (80 HP)
- ARBOS 4100AF (91 HP)
- ARBOS 4110AF (102 HP)
- ARBOS 4000E (61 HP - 92 HP) - equal size wheel
- ARBOS 3000E SW/AR (20 HP - 48 HP - equal size wheel
- ARBOS T80 (71 HP) - Transcar
