= Paolo Casali =

Italian-American immunologist

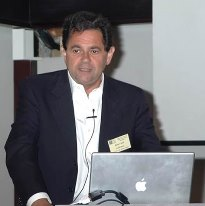
- Education: University of Milan
- Occupations: Zachry Foundation Distinguished Professor, Chairman
- Employer: Long School of Medicine University of Texas Health Science Center at San Antonio

Paolo Casali is an Italian-American immunologist. He is the Zachry Foundation Distinguished Professor at the Long School of Medicine of the University of Texas Health Science Center at San Antonio, and chairman of its department of microbiology, immunology and molecular genetics.

He is editor-in-chief of Autoimmunity.
