= Casale (surname) =

Casale is an Italian surname. Notable people with the surname include:

- Gerald Casale (born 1948), American musician
- Giovanni Casale (born 1980), Italian judoka
- Giuseppe Casale (1923–2023), Italian bishop
- Ignacio Casale (born 1987), Chilean four-wheeler motorcycle rider
- Jean Casale (1893–1923), French World War I flying ace credited with thirteen aerial victories
- Jerry Casale (1933–2019), American Major League Baseball pitcher
- Luigi Casale (1882–1927), industrial chemist
- Marcela Casale (born 1986), Italian-Argentine field hockey player for the Italian national team
- Mark Casale (born 1962), American former professional football quarterback
- Nathalie Alonso Casale (born 1970), Dutch filmmaker
- Nicolò Casale (born 1998), Italian football player
- Pamela Casale-Telford (née Casale; born 1963), American former professional tennis player
- Primo Casale (1904–1981), Italian-born Venezuelan conductor, composer, and violinist
- Rita Casale (born 1968), Italian-German educationalist, philosopher and university lecturer
- Roger Casale (born 1960), former Labour Member of Parliament for Wimbledon
- Rossana Casale (born 1959), Italian singer
- Stefano Casale (born 1971), Italian footballer
- Suzanne Casale (born 1979), birthname of the American freestyle and pop singer Lil Suzy;
- Ubertino of Casale (1259–1329), Italian theologian
