= Cerro Casale mine =

Gold mine in Atacama Region, Chile

Location
- Location: Atacama Region, Chile

Production
- Products: Gold, silver, copper

Owner
- Company: Barrick Gold

The Cerro Casale mine is one of the largest gold mines in Chile and in the world. The mine is located in the northern part of Chile in Atacama Region. The mine has estimated reserves of 23 million oz of gold and 58.7 million oz of silver.
