= Gregory di Casale =

English diplomat

Gregory di Casale (fl. 1530s) was a diplomat representing Henry VIII of England to the Papacy in the 1530s.

There was an unsubstantiated rumour that he was responsible for poisoning Catherine of Aragon; however, it is thought that she died of natural causes.

Eustace Chapuys, the ambassador to Emperor Charles V, reported that: Many suspect that if the Queen died by poison it was Gregory di Casale who sent it by a kinsman, of Modena, named Gorron, who came hither in haste, and by what he told me the night before he returned, he had come to obtain letters in behalf of the Prothonotary Casale. He said the King and Cromwell would speak to me about it, but they have not done so. Those who suspect this say the said Gregory must have earned somehow the 8 ducats a day the King gave him, and to get a slow poison which should leave no trace.
