= Autoimmunity (journal) =

- Discipline: Immunology
- Language: English

Publication details
- History: 1988–present
- Publisher: Informa Healthcare (United States)
- Frequency: 8/year
- Impact factor: 2.917 (2015)

Standard abbreviations
- ISO 4: Autoimmunity

Indexing
- ISSN: 1607-842X (print); 0891-6934 (web)

Links
- Journal homepage

Autoimmunity is an international, peer-reviewed medical journal that covers the pathogenesis, immunology, genetics, and molecular biology of immune and autoimmune responses. In addition, the journal focuses on the autoimmune processes associated with systemic lupus erythematosus, rheumatoid arthritis, Sjögren syndrome, diabetes, multiple sclerosis, and other systemic and organ-specific autoimmune diseases.
