= Rita Casale =

Italian-German educationalist (born 1968)

Rita Casale (born 3 April 1968 in Ostuni, Italy) is an Italian–German educationalist, philosopher, university lecturer, and vice president at the Bergische Universität Wuppertal. Her research and teaching focus on philosophy of education, history of science and knowledge, history of philosophy, and feminist theory.

== Life and work ==
Rita Casale studied philosophy, history and educational science at Bari, Paris and Freiburg im Breisgau. From 1993 to 1996 she was a doctoral student at the Collegio di dottorato (Bari-Ferrara-Urbino). In 1997 she was awarded a PhD in "Filosofia moderna e contemporanea" by the University of Turin. With a scholarship from the Istituto Italiano per gli Studi Filosofici, Casale undertook a research stay at the archive centre (H. Marcuse estate) of the Johann Wolfgang Goethe University Frankfurt am Main in 1997. In 2001 she was a research assistant in the Department of Educational Sciences at Goethe University, from 2002 to 2007 Scientific Assistant at the Chair of General Education of Jürgen Oelkers at the University of Zurich. For a visiting professorship she went to the Institute for Educational Science at the University of Vienna and in 2008 was a substitute professor for General Educational Science at the University of Fribourg. In 2009 she became Professor of General Educational Science and Theory of Education at the Bergische Universität Wuppertal. She gave her inaugural lecture On the Topicality of the Philosophy of Education.

Her dissertation on the theoretical, historical and political significance of Nietzschean philosophy for Martin Heidegger's thought, published in Italian in 2005, was published in German translation in 2010 under the title Heideggers Nietzsche. History of an Obsession. In her study, Casale worked through "the various roles that Nietzsche repeatedly plays in Heidegger's writings, lectures and talks." In his review of the book, Joseph Hanimann criticised the fact that Casale's search for clues lacked a summarising overview in a concluding chapter. The Austrian philosopher and former chairman of the Martin Heidegger Society, Helmuth Vetter, devoted himself to the book together with other works on Heidegger published around 2010/2012 in the Philosophische Rundschau. Vetter highlights the study's methodological precision and presentation, calling it one of the most important recent works on the topic of Nietzsche and Heidegger.

Since the 2000s, Casale has turned to feminist theory and gender studies from an educational science perspective and published several volumes on the subject. In 2011, she led a research project on Culturalisation and Epistemologisation of Feminist Theory at the University of Konstanz, based on the current state of feminist theory and the public debate on the need for a new feminism. Until 2007, she was on the board of the section "Women and Gender Studies in Educational Science" of the Deutsche Gesellschaft für Erziehungswissenschaft, from 2004 co-editor, editor and author of the journal Feministische Studien, whose scientific advisory board she is still a member of today.

From 2010 to 2019, she was co-editor of the international journal for historical educational research Paedagogica Historica. She co-edits the Jahrbuch für Historische Bildungsforschung.

Casale has been conducting research on the history of education in the Federal Republic of Germany after 1945 since the 2010s. From 2016 to 2018, she served as project director for the subsections "Sexual Education for Prospective Secondary Level I Teachers (HRGe)" (together with Jeannette Windheuser) and "Researching and Teaching School History" in KoLBi - Coherence in Teacher Education, funded by the Federal Ministry of Research, Technology and Space. Together with Gabriele Molzberger, she led the project Studium Generale in the Federal Republic of Germany after 1945, funded by the German Research Foundation from 2017 to 2021.

She is currently working on an analysis of the semantic shifts in the concept of education and its political relevance in the Federal Republic of Germany since 1945.

She served as a member of the German Research Foundation's Review Panel 1.21 "Educational science and Educational Research" (2024-2025) and as a member of the University Council at the University of Wuppertal (2020-2026); since 2026, she serves as Vice President for Sustainable Organizational Development and Diversity.

== Writings ==
- L'esperienza Nietzsche di Heidegger tra nichilismo e Seinsfrage. Bibliopolis, Neapel 2005, ISBN 88-7088-468-6 (Italian).
- Heideggers Nietzsche. Geschichte einer Obsession. Aus dem Italienischen übersetzt von Catrin Dingler. Transcript, Bielefeld 2010, ISBN 978-3-8376-1165-6.
- with Jeannette Windheuser, Monica Ferrari, Matteo Morandi (dt./engl./ital.): Kulturen der Lehrerbildung in der Sekundarstufe in Italien und Deutschland. Nationale Formate und cross culture. Verlag Julius Klinkhardt, Bad Heilbrunn 2021. doi:10.35468/5877. ISBN 978-3-7815-2464-4.
- Einführung in die Erziehungs- und Bildungsphilosophie. Brill | Schönigh, Paderborn 2022, ISBN 978-3-8252-5257-1.
- La crisi della formazione nell'età contemporanea. Idee per una nuova filosofia dell'educazione. Carocci, Roma 2026 (Italian).

Books

- with Jürgen Oelkers, Rebekka Horlacher und Sabina Larcher Klee: Bildung und Rationalisierung bei Max Weber. Beiträge zur historischen Bildungsforschung. Klinkhardt, Bad Heilbrunn 2006, ISBN 3-7815-1449-8.
- with Daniel Tröhler und Jürgen Oelkers: Methoden und Kontexte. Historiographische Probleme der Bildungsforschung. Wallstein-Verlag, Göttingen 2006, ISBN 3-8353-0077-6.
- with Barbara Rendtorff: Was kommt nach der Genderforschung? Zur Zukunft der feministischen Theoriebildung. Transcript, Bielefeld 2008, ISBN 978-3-89942-748-6.
- with Edgar Forster: Ungleiche Geschlechtergleichheit. Geschlechterpolitik und Theorien des Humankapitals (= Jahrbuch Frauen- und Geschlechterforschung in der Erziehungswissenschaft. 7). Budrich, Opladen u. a. 2011, ISBN 978-3-86649-359-9.
- with Hans-Christoph Koller and Norbert Ricken: Das Pädagogische und das Politische. Zu einem Topos der Erziehungs- und Bildungsphilosophie. Schöningh Verlag: Paderborn 2016, ISBN 978-3-506-78268-7
  - Krise der Repräsentation: Zur Sittlichkeit des Staates und Autorität des Vaters, S. 207–224, doi:10.30965/9783657782680_013
- with Markus Rieger-Ladich and Christiane Thompsen: Verkörperte Bildung. Körper und Leib in geschichtlichen und gesellschaftlichen Transformationen. Beltz, Weinheim/Basel 2019, ISBN 978-3-7799-6058-4
- with Markus Rieger-Ladich and Christiane Thompson: Un-/Zugehörigkeit. Bildungsphilosophische Reflexionen und machttheoretische Studien. Beltz, Weinheim/Basel 2020, ISBN 978-3-7799-6057-7
- with Monica Ferrari, Matteo Morandi and Jeannette Windheuser: La formazione degli insegnanti della secondaria in Italia e in Germania: una questione culturale. FrancoAngeli, Mailand 2021, als Open Access zum Download: ojs.francoangeli.it/_omp/index.php/oa/catalog/book/694. ISBN 978-88-351-2267-8 (Italian).
- with Gabriele Molzberger: Zur Geschichte und Aktualität des Studium Generale. Past and Present of Liberal Education. Böhlau, Köln 2023, ISBN 978-3-412-52582-8.
- with Fabian Kessl, Nicolle Pfaff, Martina Richter and Anja Tervooren: (De)Institutionalisierung von Bildung und Erziehung. Campus, Frankfurt a. M. 2024, ISBN 978-3-593-45774-1.
- with Markus Rieger-Ladich, Flora Petrik, Pia Rojahn and Wolfgang Meseth: Rhetorik der Inklusion, Praxis der Exklusion. Selbstbeobachtungen der Erziehungswissenschaft. Beltz Juventa, Weinheim 2026, ISBN 978-3-7799-9181-6.
