= Giulio Casali =

Sammarinese footballer and manager

Personal information
- Full name: Giulio Cesare Casali
- Date of birth: 13 February 1942 (age 84)
- Place of birth: San Marino
- Position: Forward

Senior career*
Years	Team	Apps	(Gls)
- A.C. Libertas
- San Marino Calcio

Managerial career
- 1986–1990: San Marino
- * Club domestic league appearances and goals

Giulio Cesare Casali (born 13 February 1942) is a Sammarinese professional football player and manager.

== Career ==
He played for the A.C. Libertas and San Marino Calcio.

After finishing his playing career, he became a youth coach for San Marino Calcio and then served as assistant coach of the first team. On 24 January 1986, he was appointed coach of the San Marino national football team, the first in its history. His first call was on 7 March 1986 for a match five days later against the formation Danish team from Odense, which marked the unofficial debut of the national team. Following this, Casali coached the national team for four more matches before leaving in 1990 for health reasons: San Marino vs Canada Olympic (0-1, friendly, 28 March 1986), Lebanon vs San Marino (0-0, Mediterranean Games, 16 September 1987), Syria vs San Marino (3-0, Mediterranean Games, 18 September 1987) and Turkey vs San Marino (4-0, Mediterranean Games, 20 September 1987).
