= Museo dell'Accademia Etrusca =

Museum in Cortona, Italy

Coordinates: 43°16′32″N 11°59′06″E

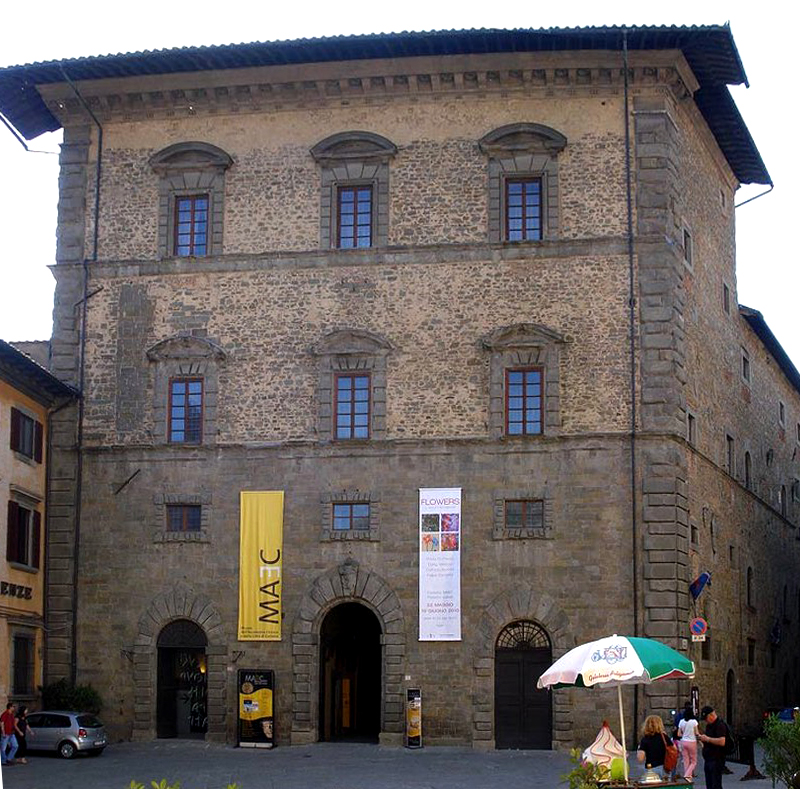
Facade of the Palazzo Casali and entrance to MAEC

The Museo dell'Accademia Etrusca (Museum of the Etruscan Academy) is a public archeological museum housed in the Palazzo Casali, also known as the town's Palazzo Pretorio, located in the historic center of Cortona, province of Arezzo, region of Tuscany, Italy. The museum entrance faces Piazza Signorelli, and is one house east of a facade of city hall (Palazzo Comunale) and sits west across Via Casali from the Teatro Signorelli. This was one of the first public museums in Italy. Now linked with the Civic Art museum of Cortona, the complex is known as the MAEC (Museo dell’Accademia Etrusca e della Città di Cortona),

== Description ==
The 18th-century spawned a renewed interest in an Italian, if not Tuscan, antiquity; to many the most autochthonous antiquity in Tuscany was assigned to the Etruscans. In Cortona, this coalesced to form the Etruscan Academy, which originated as a literate "Society for the purchase of books" founded by the Venuti brothers in 1726. The next year, the academy was constituted as the Accademia di Scienze et Erudizioni. Abbot Onofrio Baldelli, a collector of rocks, fossils, and Etruscan antiquities donated his collections to group. In 1728, it became the Accademia Etrusca delle Antichità ed Iscrizioni. The initial donation included a pair of globes (terrestrial and celestial) dated 1714–15, and another celestial globe dated 1710.

The Library of the academy, in the same building as the Museum, possessed manuscripts, codexes and parchments dating as old as the 11th through the 19th century, rare printed texts from the 15th and 16th centuries and thousands of volumes from later times.

The Palazzo Casali in which the collection was held was built by the 13th-century by the Casali family, who resided here from 1325 to 1409, while they were then lords of Cortona. When Cortona became property of Tuscany, this palace housed the appointed captains, and was known as the Palazzo Pretorio. The heraldic shields displayed on its external walls belonged to the various leaders. Starting from 1728 the main floor (piano nobile) hosted the Accademia Etrusca and its Museum.

The two underground floors, that were prisons in the past, now house the Museum of the Etruscan and Roman City of Cortona. The civic museums of Cortona were re-organized in 2005, forming what is now the MAEC (Museo dell’Accademia Etrusca e della Città di Cortona). The first floor houses the town library BCAE (Biblioteca del Comune) and the historical archive of the academy.

== Collections ==
The museum includes:

- Corbelli collections of Egyptian archeology
- Etruscan collections include jewelry, statuettes, sarcophagi, amphorae, a bronze chandelier, a golden fibula in the shape of a lion, and the Tabula Cortonensis (a long, 2nd-3rd century BC, apparently notarial Etruscan text in a series of bonze tablets).
- Pinacoteca houses a Tondo depicting Madonna and child with Saints Michael, Vincent, Margaret and Mark by Luca Signorelli and a triptych depicting Madonna and child with Saints by Bicci di Lorenzo
- The museum also displays the Rococo Porcelain piece called the Tempietto Ginori. This elaborate porcelain structure is complex allegory about the passage of the Grand Duchy from Medici to Lorraine rule, donated to the Accademia in 1756 by Marquis Carlo Ginori and manufactured at the Doccia porcelain factory.
- Tomassi donation including items in use during 18th-century

== Gallery ==
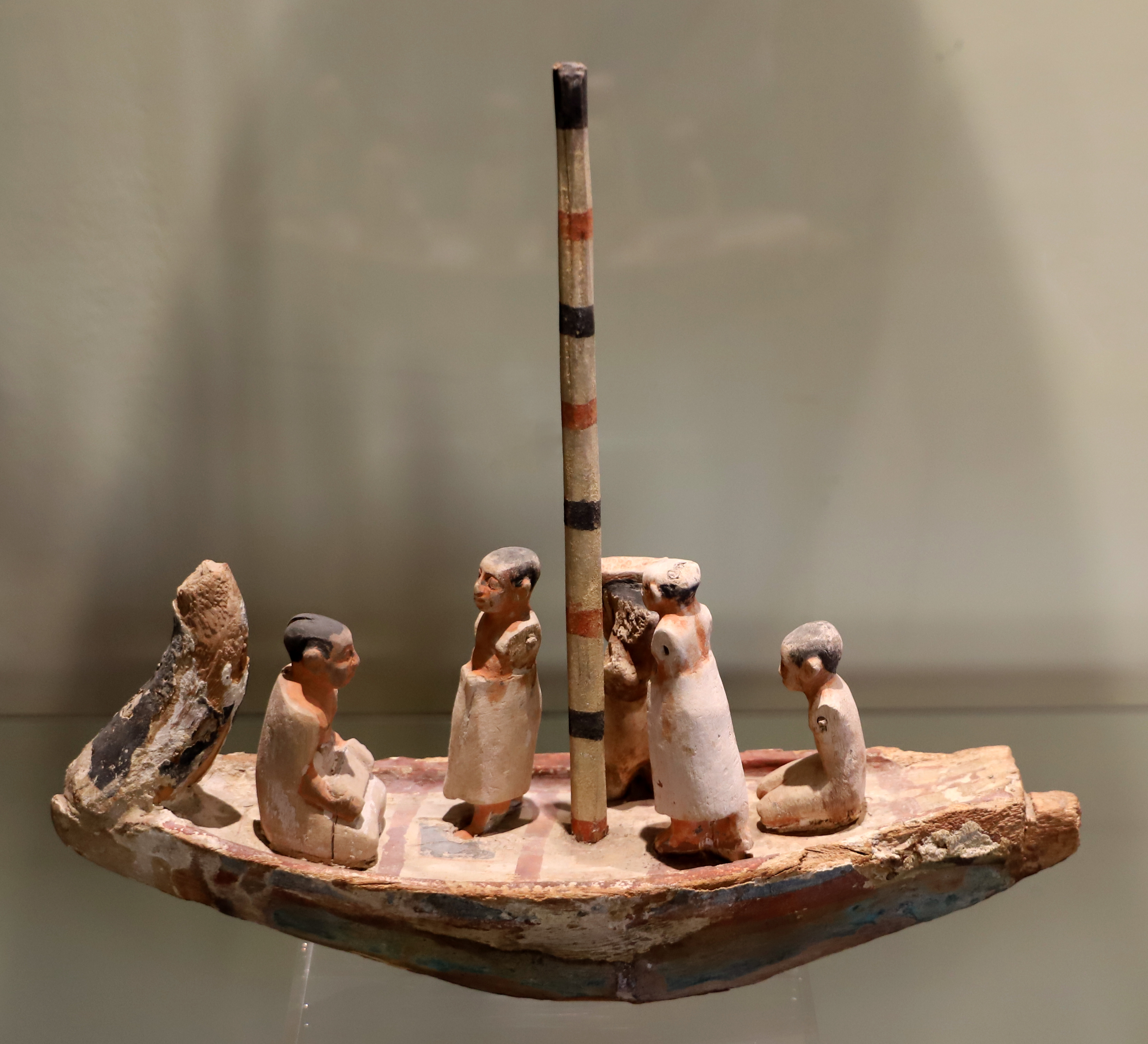
Model of Egyptian Funereal Solar barque

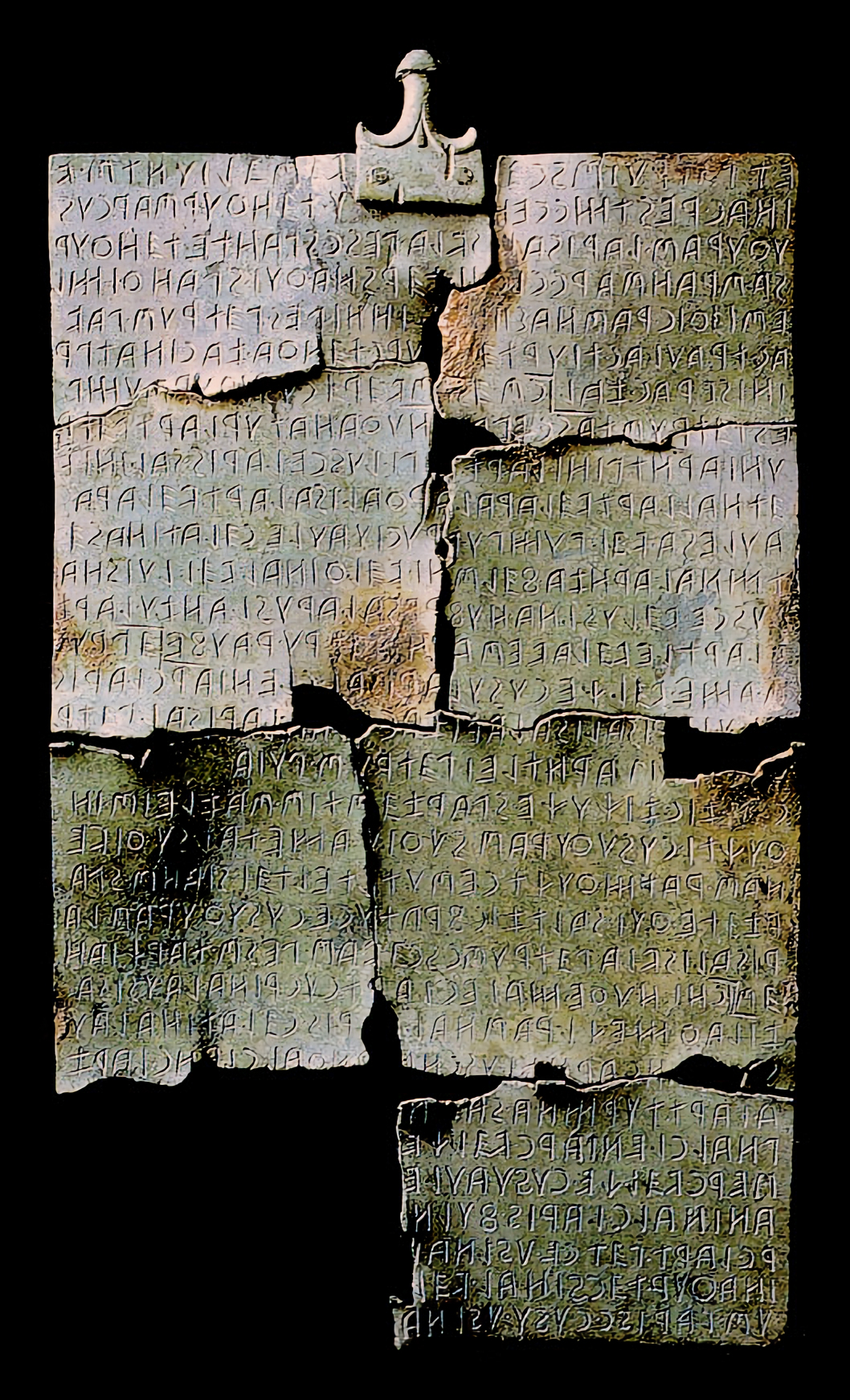
Tabula Cortonensis

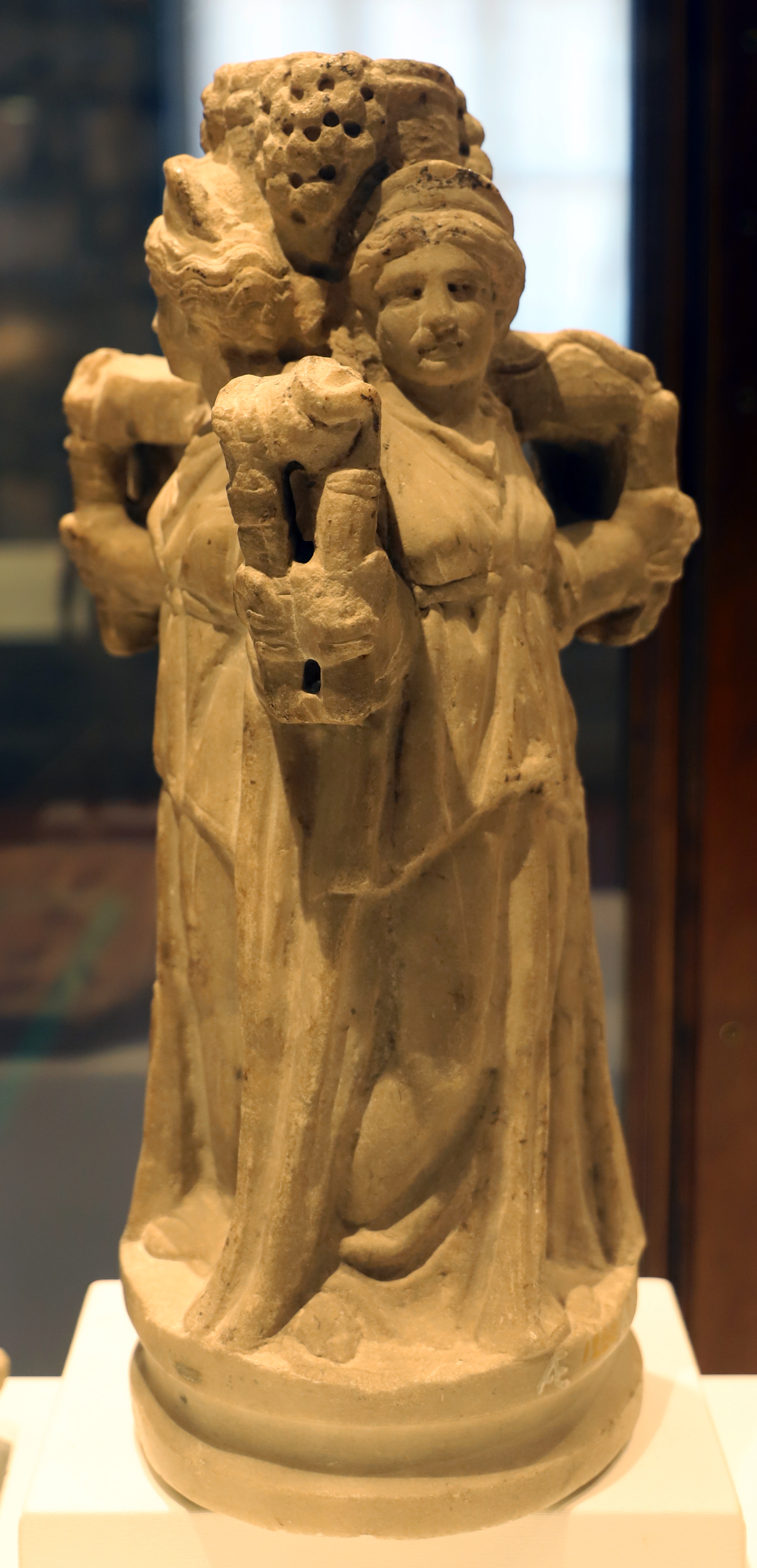
Ancient Roman statue of Hecate (Roman Trivia)

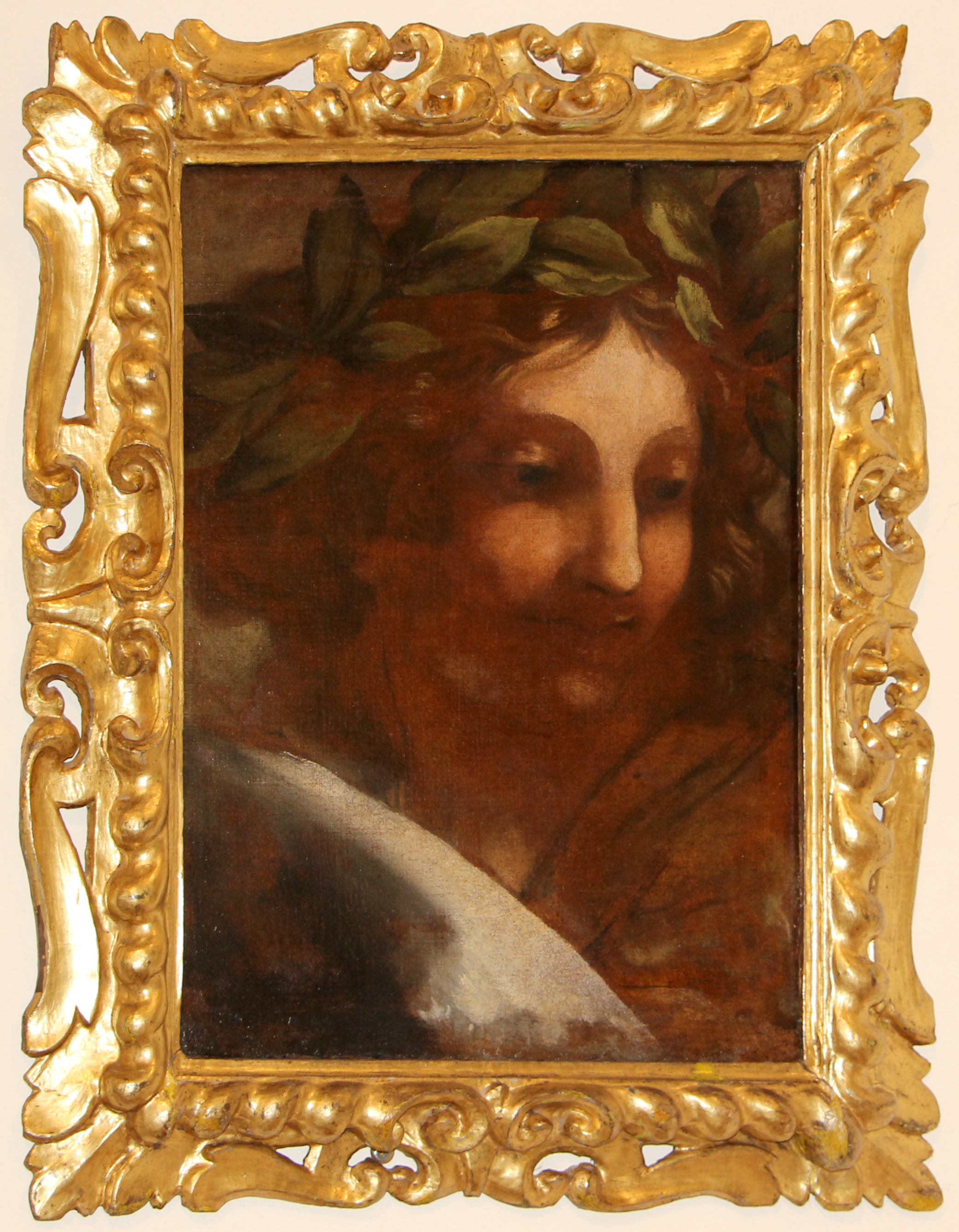
Genius with Laurel Crown (1633–1639) by Pietro da Cortona

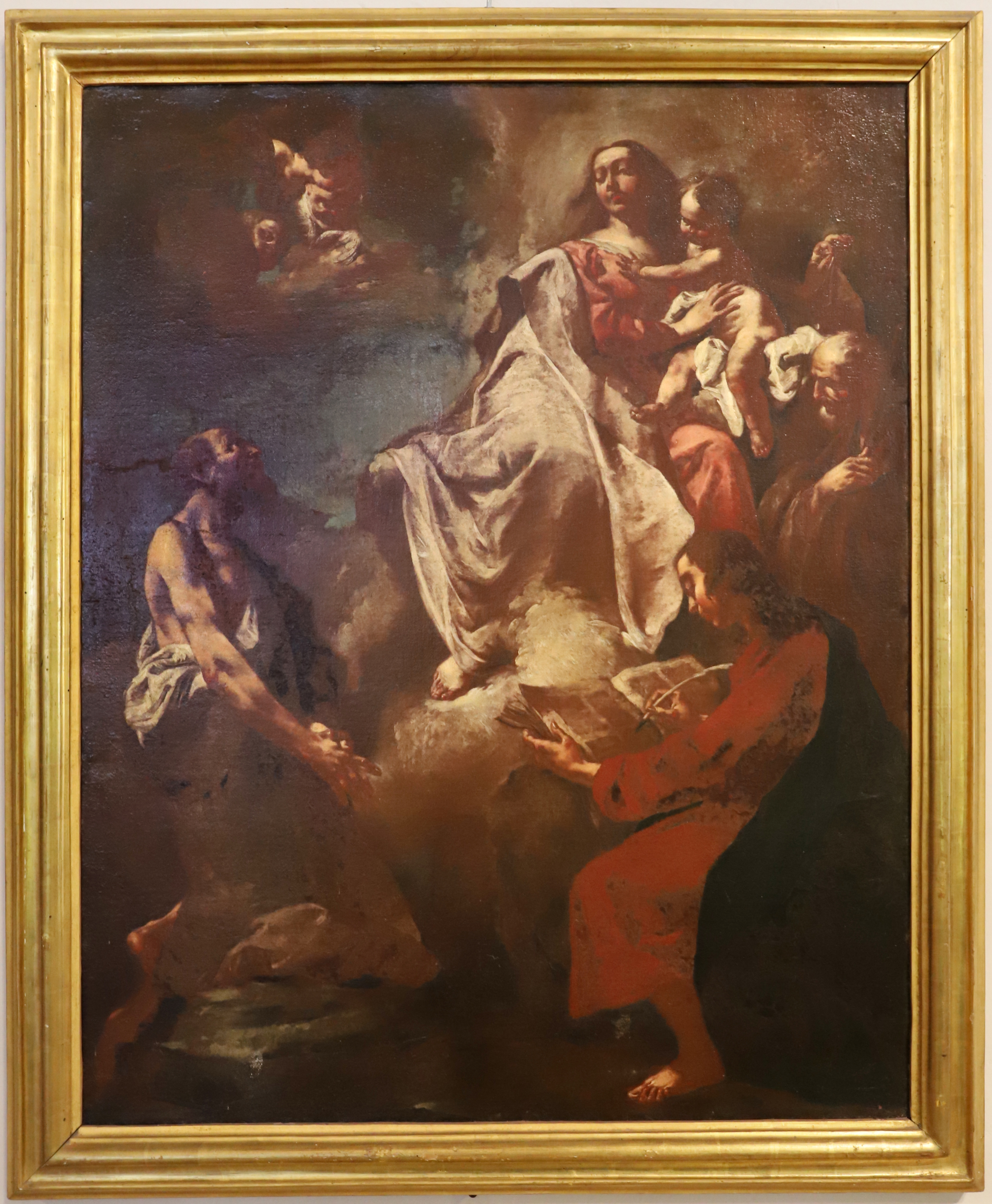
Madonna and Child with Saints Andrew, Joseph, and John the evangelist(1739) by GB Piazetta

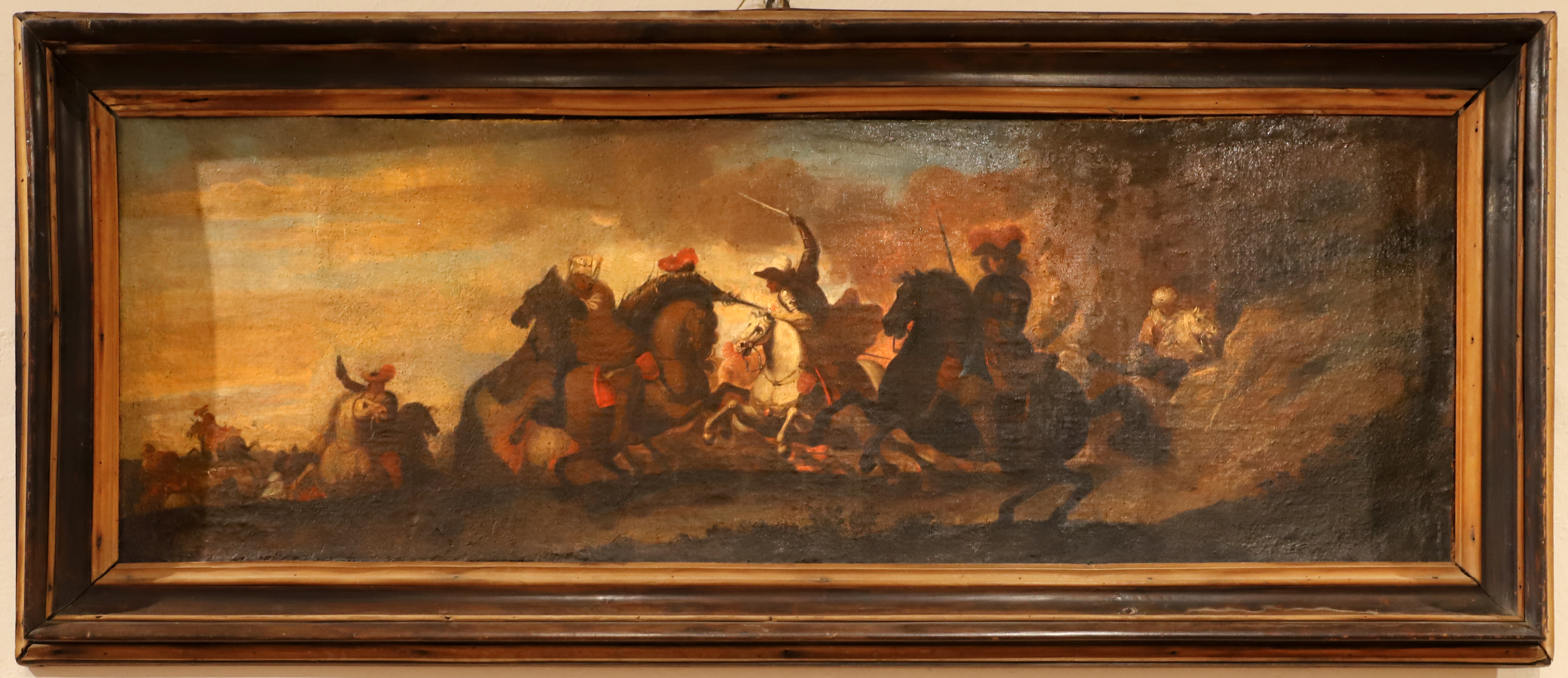
Battle painting by school of Jacques Courtois, il Borgognone

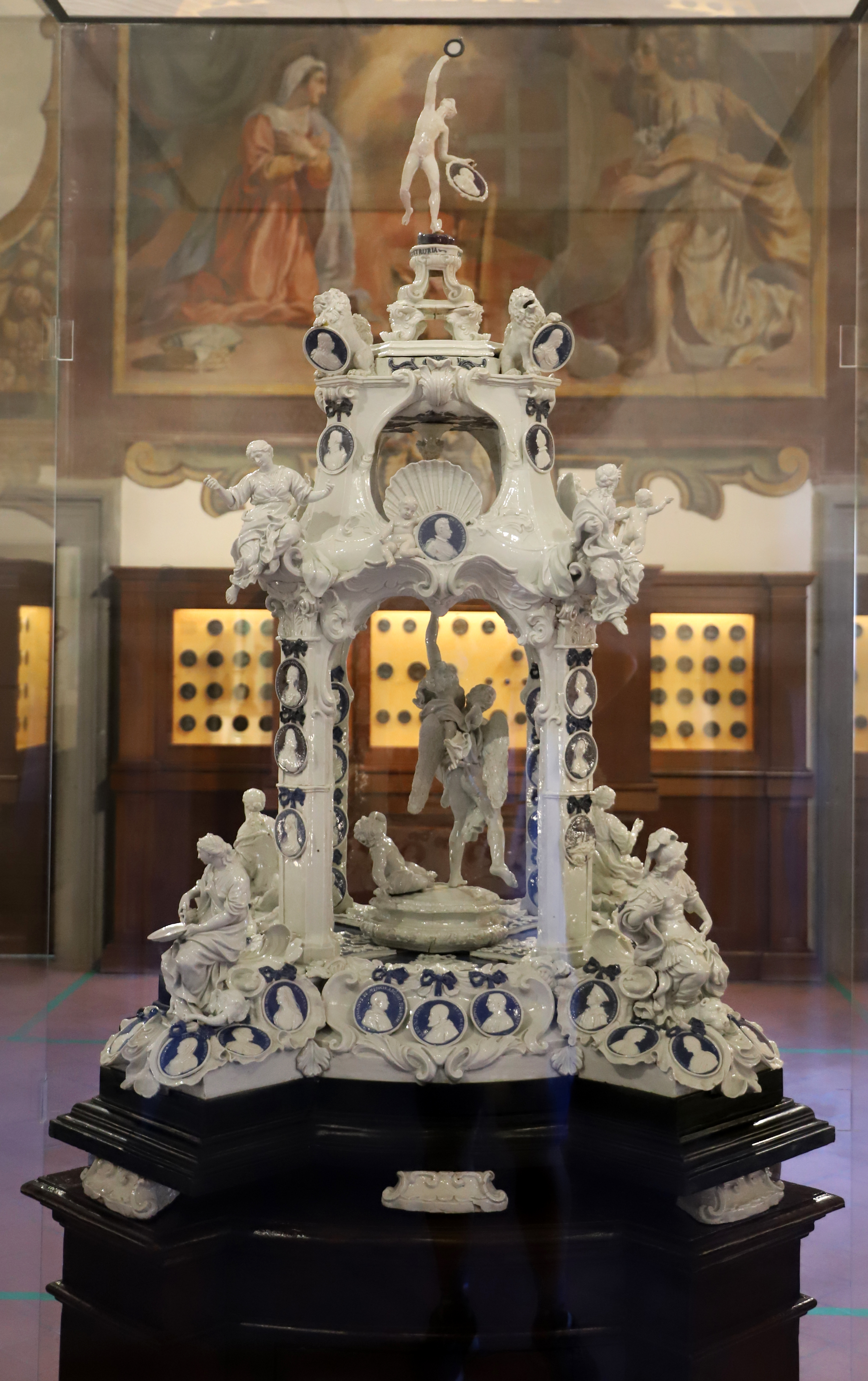
Tempietto Ginori

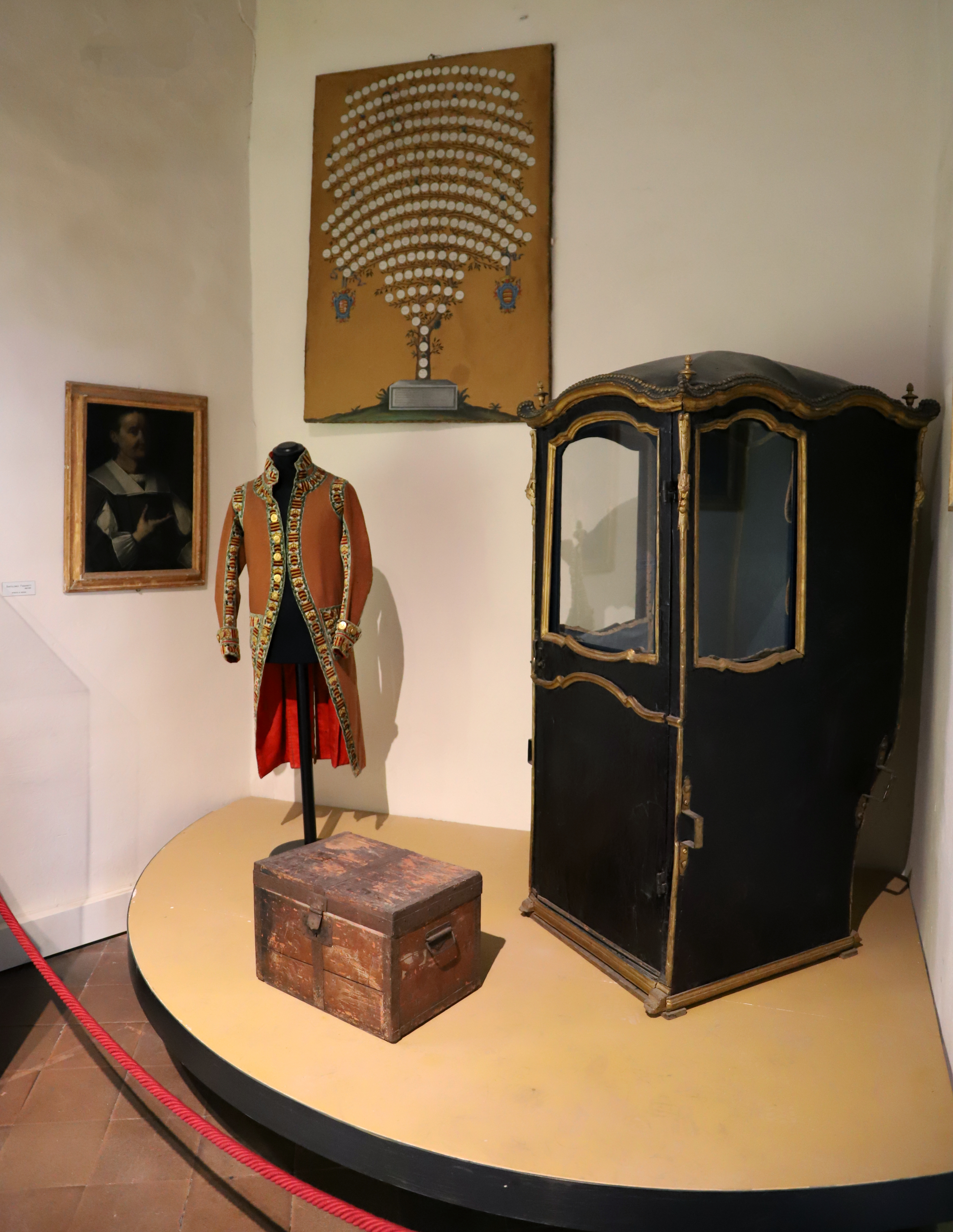
Sedan chair and livery
